= Casablanca =

Largest city in Morocco

Casablanca الدار البيضاء (Arabic) ad-Dār al-Bayḍāʾ ⴷⴷⴰⵔ ⵍⴱⵉⴹⴰ / ⵜⵉⴳⵎⵎⵉ ⵜⵓⵎⵍⵉⵍⵜ (Standard Moroccan Tamazight)
- City
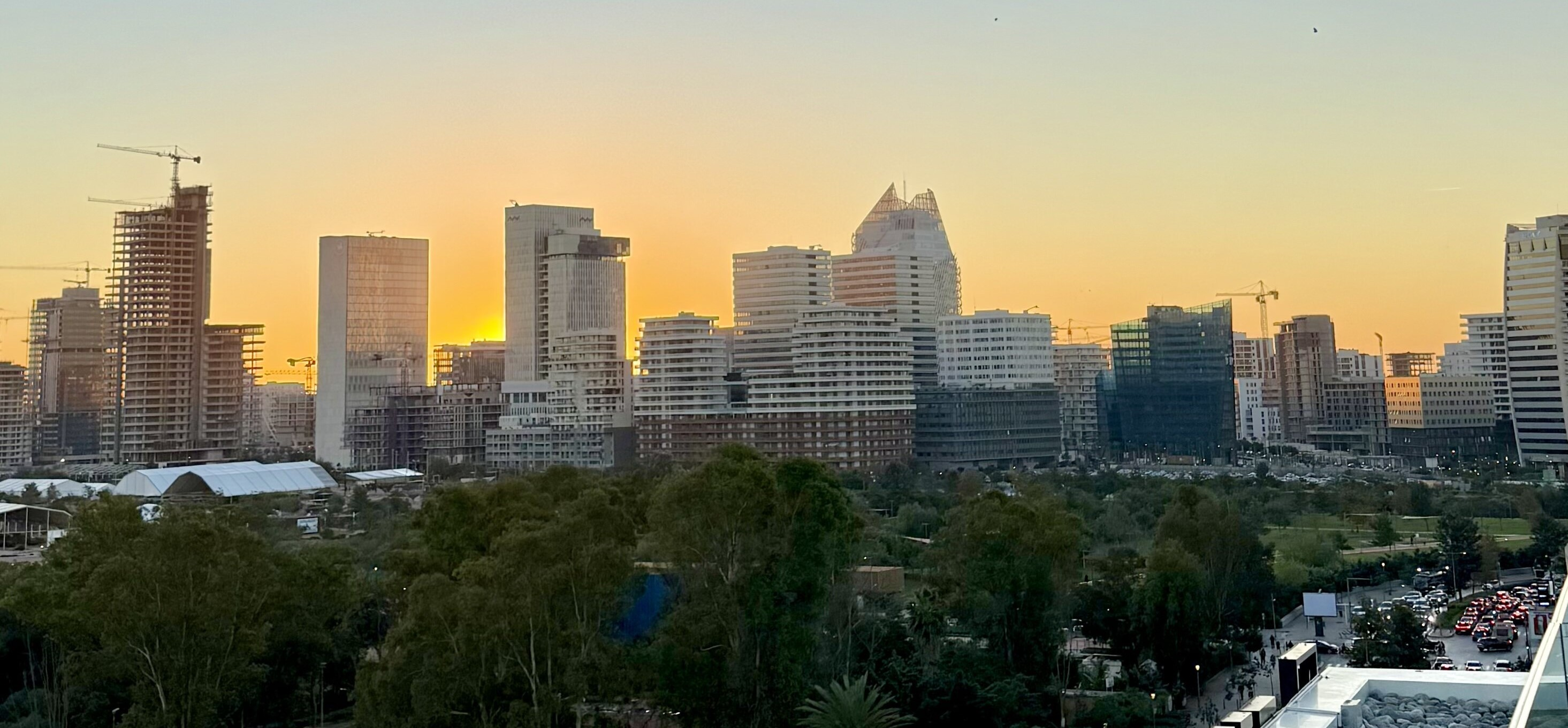
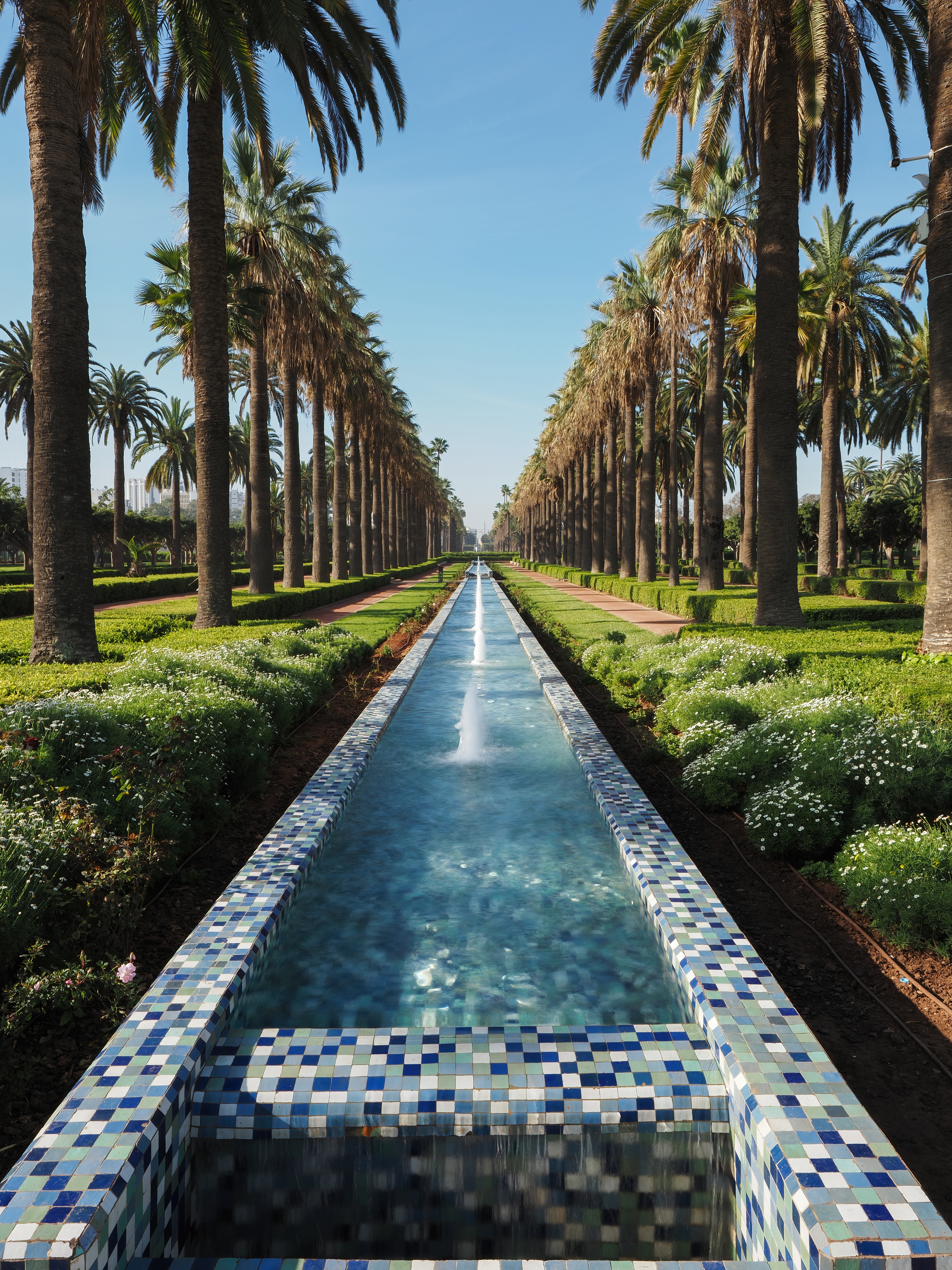
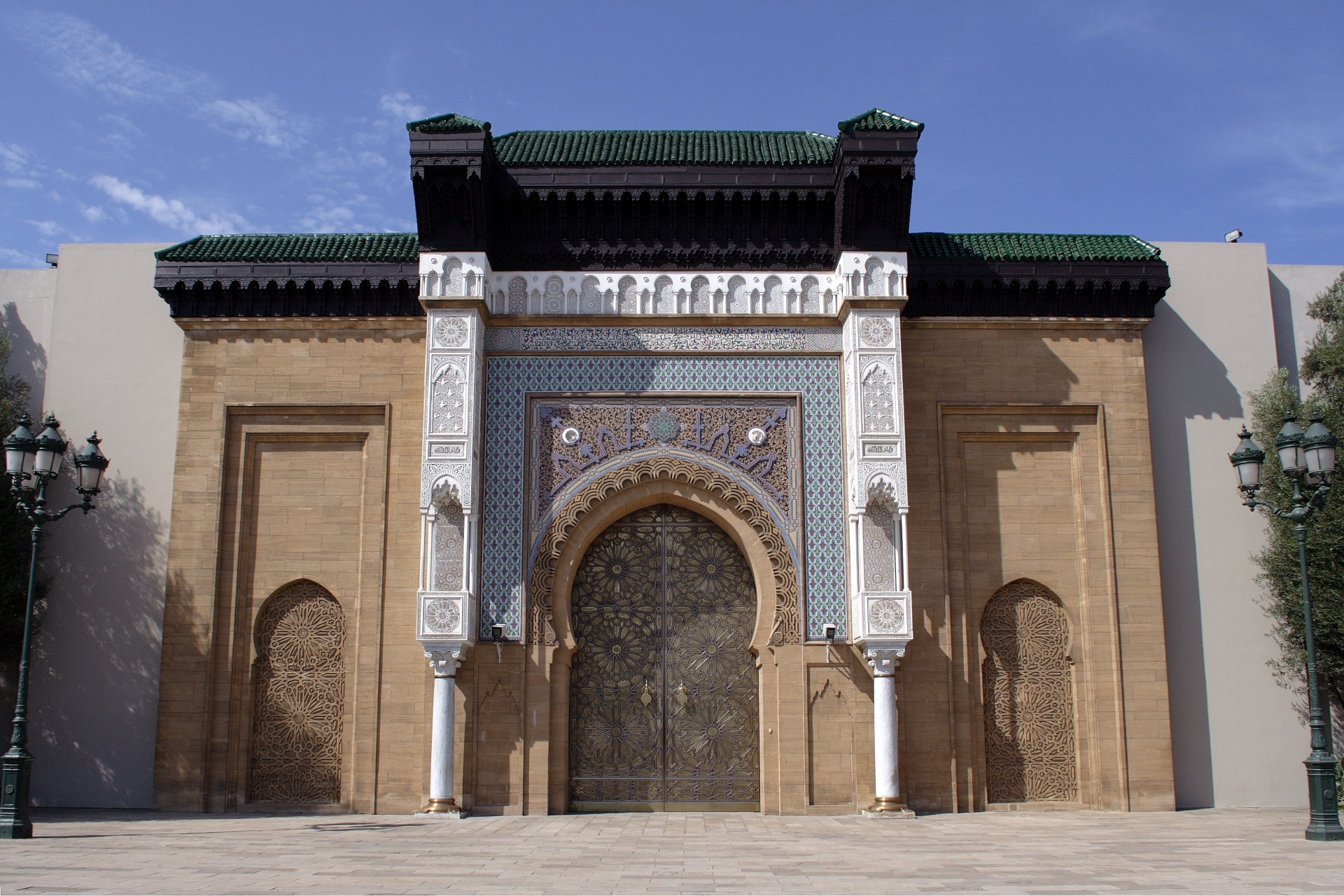
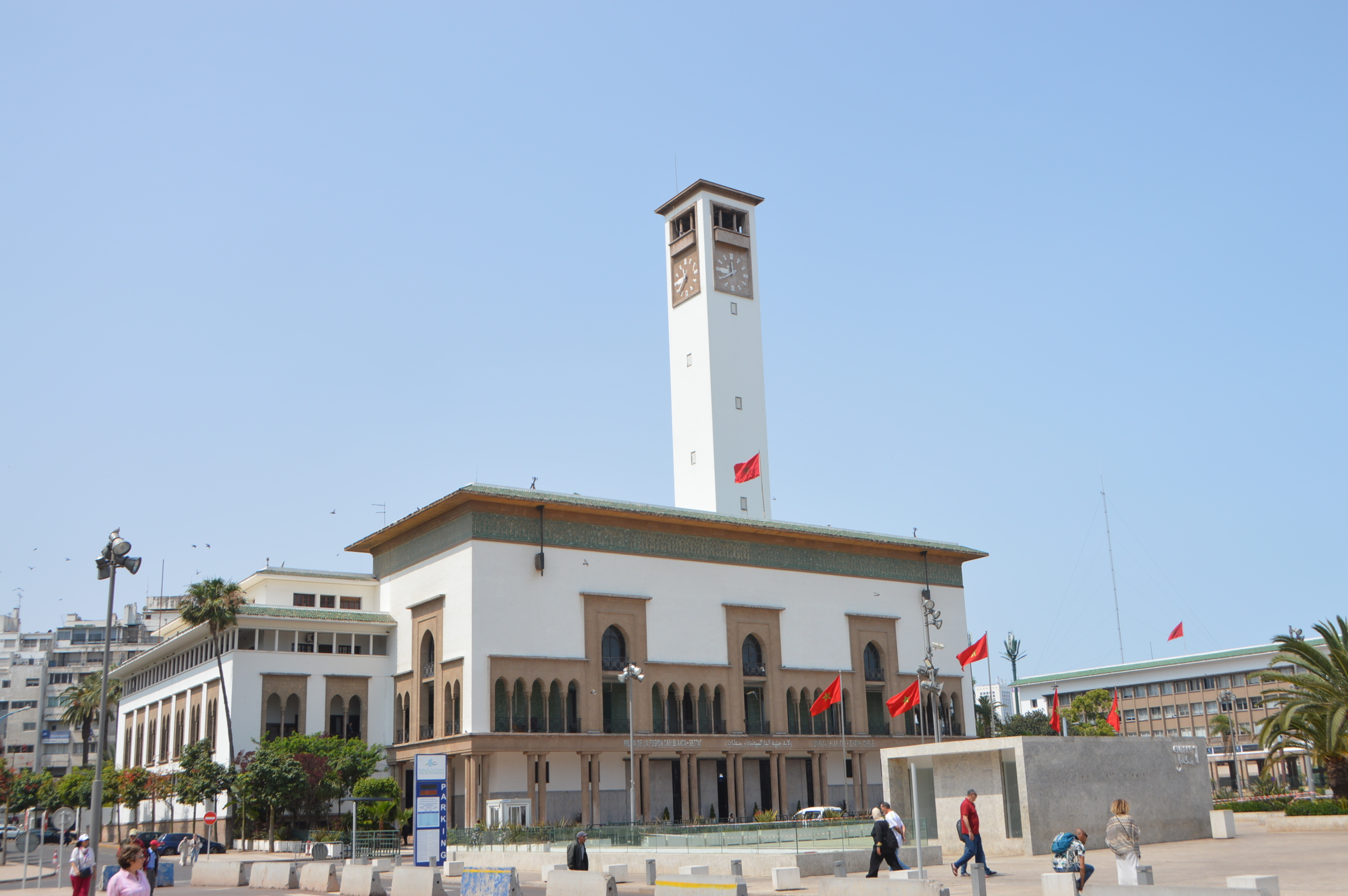
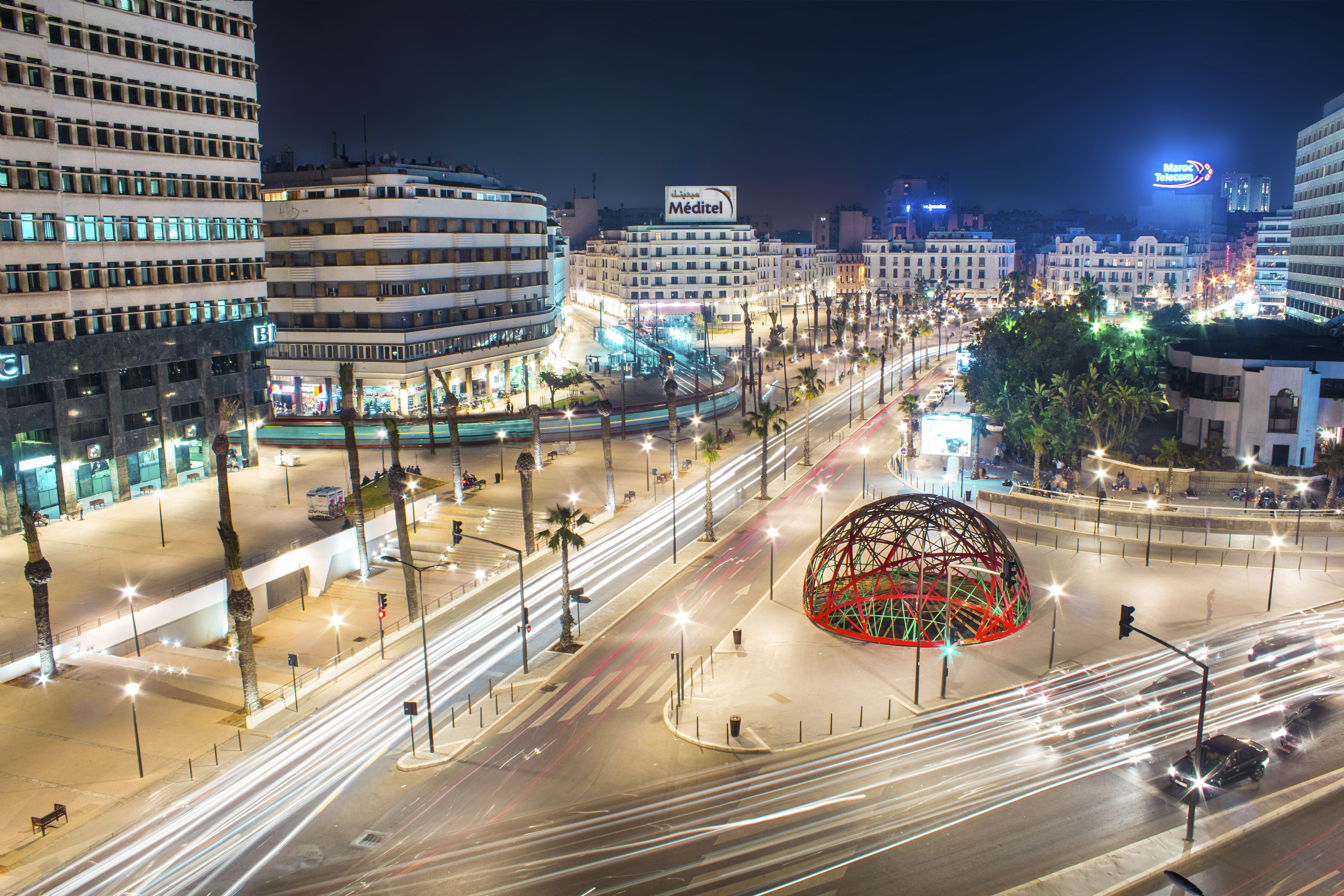
- Casablanca Finance City Hassan II Mosque Arab League Park Casablanca Cathedral Royal Palace of Casablanca Wilaya Building United Nations Square Casablanca Twin Center

- Seal Wordmark
- Nickname: Casa
- Interactive map of Casablanca
- Coordinates: 33°36′N 7°38′W
- Country: Morocco
- Region: Casablanca-Settat
- First Settled: 7th century BC
- Reconstructed: 1756
- Founder: Mohammed III

Government
  - Mayor: Nabila Rmili (RNI)

Area
  - City: 380 km^{2} (148 sq mi)
  - Urban: 386 km^{2} (149 sq mi)
  - Metro: 1,100 km^{2} (420 sq mi)
- Elevation: 0 to 150 m (0 to 492 ft)

Population (2024)
  - City: 3,218,036
  - Rank: 1st in Morocco
  - Density: 8,800/km^{2} (22,700/sq mi)
  - Urban: 3,950,000
  - Metro: 4,270,750
- Demonyms: Casablancan; Kazāwi (كازاوي); Biḍāwi (بيضاوي) casablancais
- Time zone: UTC+0 (GMT)
- Postal code: 20000-20200
- Website: www.casablancacity.ma

Casablanca (Note: /ˌkæsəˈblæŋkə/, US also /ˌkɑːsəˈblɑːŋkə/; Arabic: الدار البيضاء, romanized: ad-Dār al-Bayḍāʾ, lit. 'the White House', IPA: [adˈdaːr ɫbajdˤaːʔ] Standard Moroccan Tamazight: ⴷⴷⴰⵔ ⵍⴱⵉⴹⴰ / ⵜⵉⴳⵎⵎⵉ ⵜⵓⵎⵍⵉⵍⵜ) is the largest city in Morocco and the country's economic and business centre. Located on the Atlantic coast of the Chaouia plain in the central-western part of Morocco, the city has a population of about 3.22 million in the urban area, and over 4.27 million in Greater Casablanca, making it the most populous city in the Maghreb region, and the ninth-largest in the Arab world.

The Port of Casablanca is one of the largest artificial ports in Africa, and the third-largest port in North Africa, after Tanger-Med (40 km or 25 mi east of Tangier) and Port Said. Casablanca also hosts the primary naval base for the Royal Moroccan Navy.

Casablanca is a significant financial centre, ranking 38th globally in the September 2026 Global Financial Centres Index rankings. The Casablanca Stock Exchange is Africa's third-largest in terms of market capitalization, as of December 2022.

Major Moroccan companies and many of the largest American and European companies operating in the country have their headquarters and main industrial facilities in Casablanca. Recent industrial statistics show that Casablanca is the main industrial zone in the country.

== Etymology ==
=== Anfa ===
Before the 15th century, the settlement at what is now Casablanca had been called Anfa, rendered in European sources variously as El-Anfa, Anafa or Anaffa, Anafe, Anife, Anafee, Nafe, and Nafee. Ibn Khaldun ascribed the name to the Anfaça, a branch of the Awraba tribe of the Maghreb, though the sociologist André Adam refuted this claim due to the absence of the third syllable. Nahum Slouschz gave a Hebrew etymology, citing the Lexicon of Gesenius: anâphâh (a type of bird) or anaph (face, figure), though Adam refuted this arguing that even a Judaized population would still have spoken Tamazight. Adam also refuted an Arabic etymology, أنف (anf, "nose"), as the city predated the linguistic Arabization of the country, and the term anf was not used to describe geographic areas. Adam affirmed a Tamazight etymology—from anfa "hill", anfa "promontory on the sea", ifni "sandy beach", or anfa "threshing floor"—although he determined the available information insufficient to establish exactly which.

The name "Anfa" was used in maps until around 1830—in some until 1851—which Adam attributes to the tendency of cartographers to replicate previous maps.

=== Casablanca ===
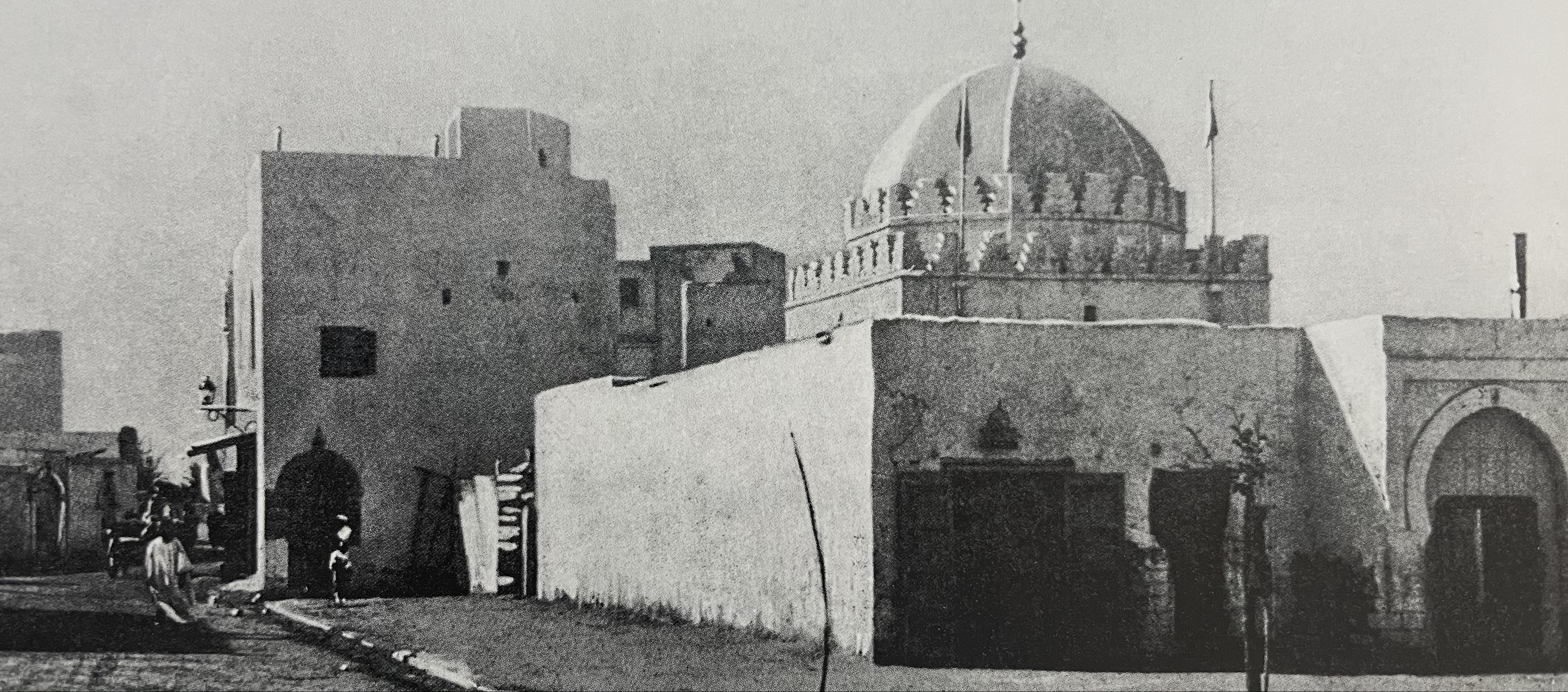
The Mausoleum of Allal al-Qairawani, which local legend associates with the naming of Casablanca

When the ʿAlawi Sultan Mohammed ben Abdallah (c. 1710–1790) rebuilt the city after its destruction in the earthquake of 1755, it was renamed "ad-Dār al-Bayḍāʾ " (الدار البيضاء The White House), though in vernacular use it was pronounced "Dar al-Baiḍā" (دار البيضاء literally House of the White, although in Moroccan Arabic vernacular it retains the original sense of The White House).

The origins of the name "Casablanca" are unclear, although several theories have been suggested. André Adam mentions the legend of the Sufi saint and merchant Allal al-Qairawani, who supposedly came from Tunisia and settled in Casablanca with his wife Lalla al-Baiḍāʾ (لالة البيضاء White Lady). The villagers of Mediouna would reportedly provision themselves at "Dar al-Baiḍāʾ" (دار البيضاء House of the White).

In fact, on a low hill slightly inland above the ruins of Anfa and just to the west of today's city centre, it appears there was a white-washed structure, possibly a Sufi zawiya that acted as a landmark to sailors. The Portuguese cartographer Duarte Pacheco wrote in the early 16th century that the city could easily be identified by a tower, and nautical guides from the late 19th century still mentioned a "white tower" as a point of reference. The Portuguese mariners calqued the modern Arabic name to "Casa Branca" ([kazɐ'bɾɐ̃kɐ] White House) in place of Anfa. The name "Casablanca" was then a calque of the Portuguese name when the Spanish took over trade through the Iberian Union.

During the French protectorate in Morocco, the name remained Casablanca (pronounced [kazablɑ̃ka]). Today, Moroccans still call the city Casablanca or Casa for short, or by its Arabic name, pronounced d-Dār l-Biḍā in Moroccan Arabic or ad-Dāru-l-Bayḍā' in Standard Arabic.

== History ==
=== Early history ===
The area that is today Casablanca was founded and settled by Berbers by the seventh century BC. It was used as a port by the Phoenicians, then the Romans. In his book Description of Africa, Leo Africanus refers to ancient Casablanca as "Anfa", a great city of Tamasna founded in the Berber kingdom of Barghawata in 744 AD. He believed Anfa was the most "prosperous city on the Atlantic Coast because of its fertile land." Barghawata rose as an independent state around this time, and continued until it was conquered by the Almoravids in 1068. After the defeat of the Barghawata in the 12th century, Arab tribes of Hilal and Sulaym descent settled in the region, mixing with the local Berbers, which led to widespread Arabization. During the 14th century, under the Merinids, Anfa rose in importance as a port. The last of the Merinids were ousted by a popular revolt in 1465.

=== Portuguese conquest and Spanish influence ===
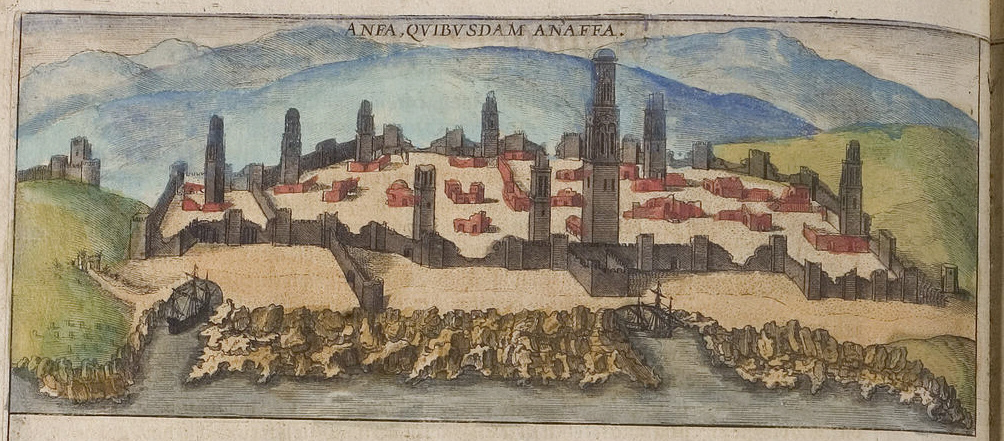
Casablanca in 1572, still called "Anfa" in this coloured engraving, although the Portuguese had already renamed it "Casa Branca" – "White House" – later Hispanicised to "Casablanca"

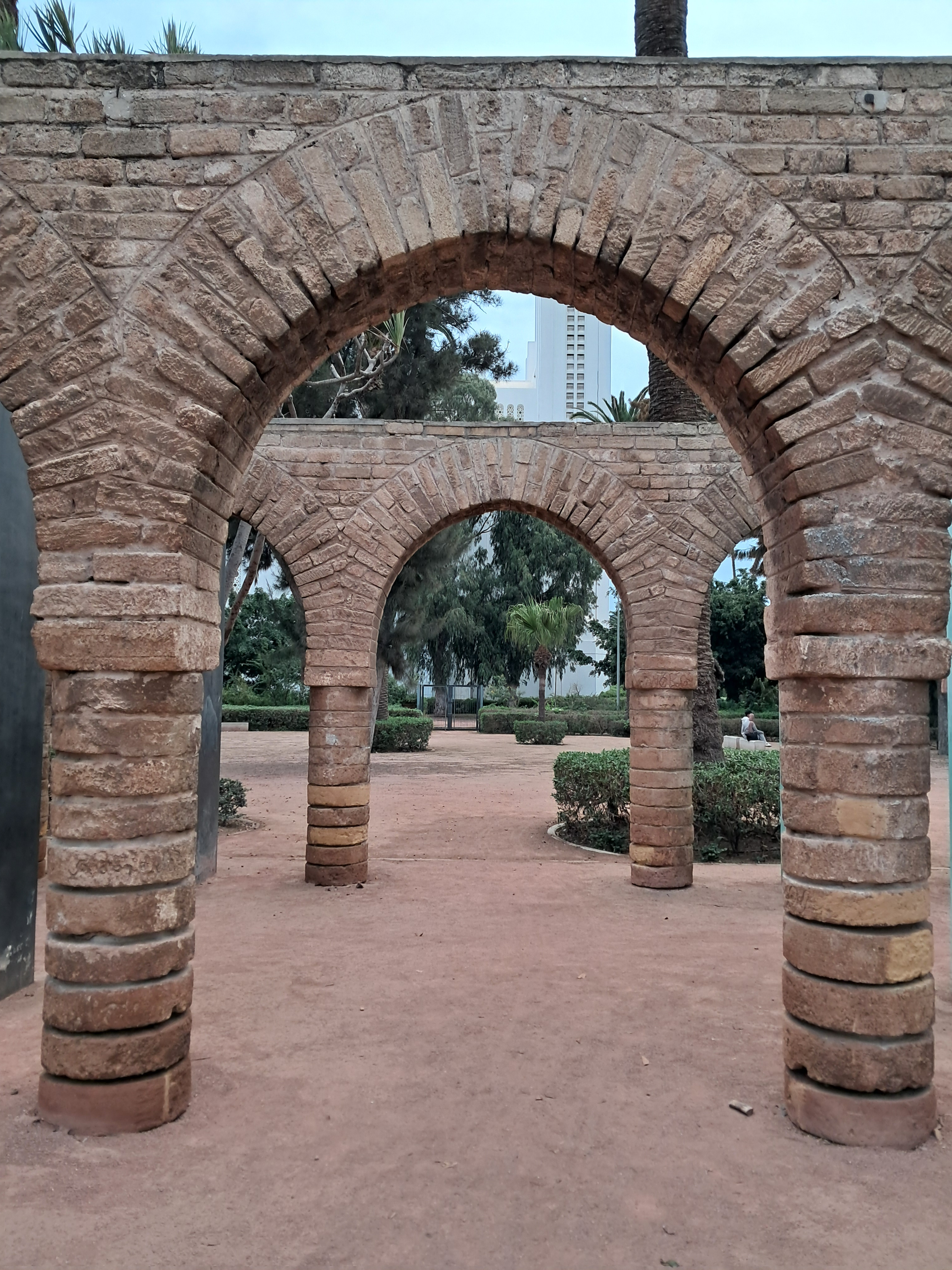
Ruins of the old Portuguese prison at Arab League Park. Hubert Lyautey had some arches from the old Portuguese prison, also known as the Prison of Anfa, moved east toward what is now Hassan II Boulevard, to decorate the park, serving as a support for a pergola.

In the early 15th century, the town became an independent state once again, and emerged as a safe harbour for pirates and privateers. The Portuguese consequently bombarded the town into ruins in 1468. The town that grew up around it was called Casa Branca, meaning "white house" in Portuguese.

=== Reconstruction under Sultan Mohammed ben Abdallah, 1756–90 ===
Sultan Mohammed ben Abdallah constructed the port and rebuilt the town between 1756 and 1790—likely after the Portuguese evacuation of Mazagan in 1769, in order to preempt a Christian attack or return by fortifying defenses between Rabat and Mazagan (now El Jadida). The town was called ad-Dār al-Bayḍāʼ (الدار البيضاء), the Arabic translation of the Portuguese Casa Branca.

=== Colonial struggle ===
In the 19th century, the area's population began to grow as it became a major supplier of wool to the booming textile industry in Britain and shipping traffic increased (the British, in return, began importing gunpowder tea, used in Morocco's national drink, mint tea). By the 1860s, around 5,000 residents were there, and the population grew to around 10,000 by the late 1880s. Casablanca remained a modestly sized port, with a population reaching around 12,000 within a few years of the French conquest and arrival of French colonialists in 1906. By 1921, this rose to 110,000, largely through the development of shanty towns.

=== Bombardment of Casablanca ===
The Treaty of Algeciras of 1906 formalized French preeminence in Morocco and included three measures that directly impacted Casablanca: that French officers would control operations at the customs office and seize revenue as collateral for loans given by France, that the French holding company La Compagnie Marocaine would develop the port of Casablanca, and that a French-and-Spanish-trained police force would be assembled to patrol the port.

To build the port's breakwater, narrow-gauge track was laid in June 1907 for a small Decauville locomotive to connect the port to a quarry in Roches Noires, passing through the sacred Sidi Belyout graveyard. In resistance to this and the measures of the 1906 Treaty of Algeciras, tribesmen of the Chaouia attacked the locomotive, killing 9 Compagnie Marocaine laborers—3 French, 3 Italians, and 3 Spanish.

In response, the French bombarded the city in August 1907 with multiple gunboats and landed troops inside the town, causing severe damage and killing between 600 and 3,000 Moroccans. Estimates for the total casualties are as high as 15,000 dead and wounded. In the immediate aftermath of the bombardment and the deployment of French troops, the European homes and the Mellah, or Jewish quarter, were sacked, and the latter was also set ablaze.

As Oujda had already been occupied, the bombardment and military invasion of the city opened a western front to the French military conquest of Morocco.

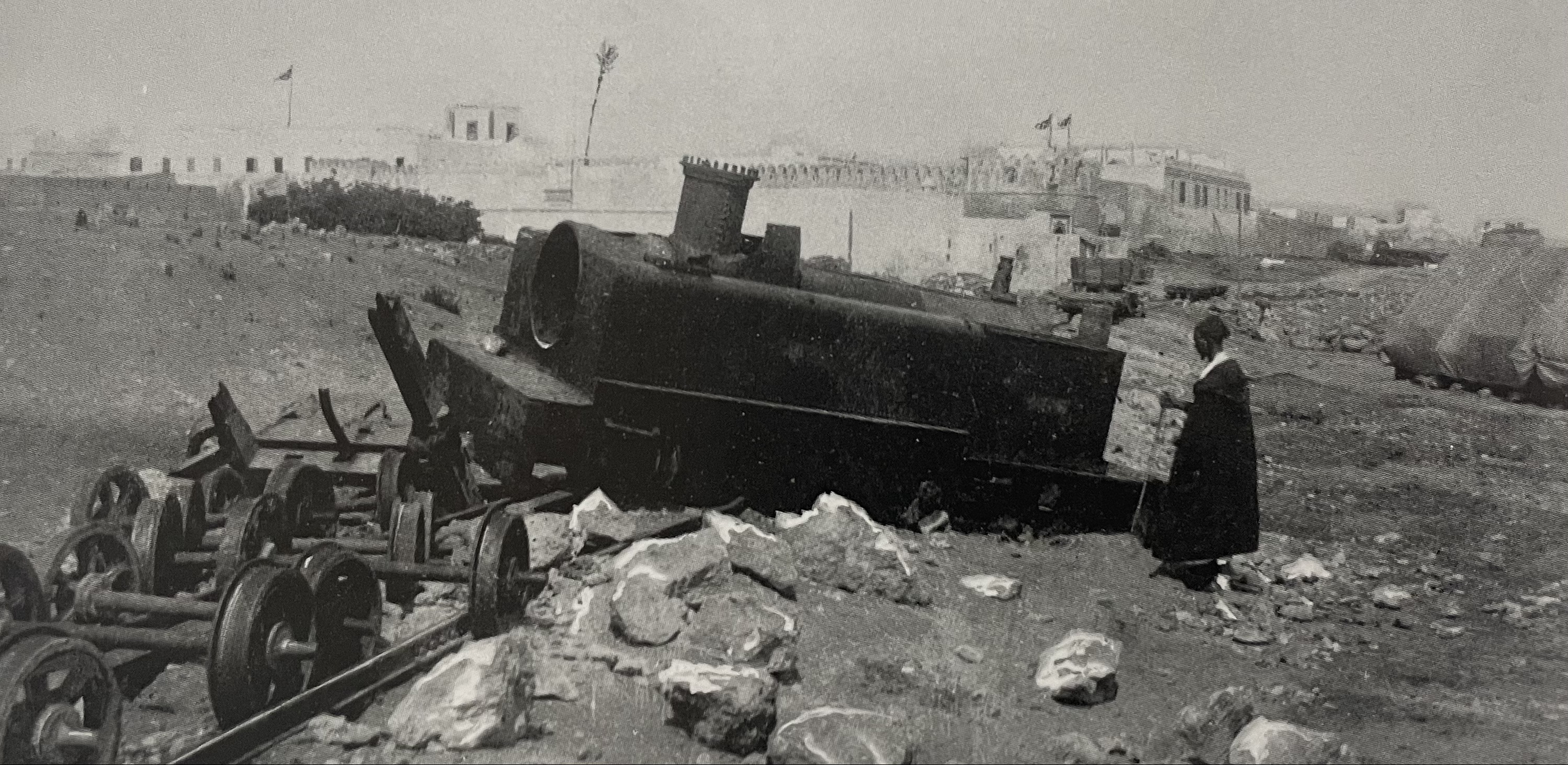
A man inspects the derailed Decauville locomotive at the scene of the attack that served as the pretext for the French bombardment of Casablanca in 1907.

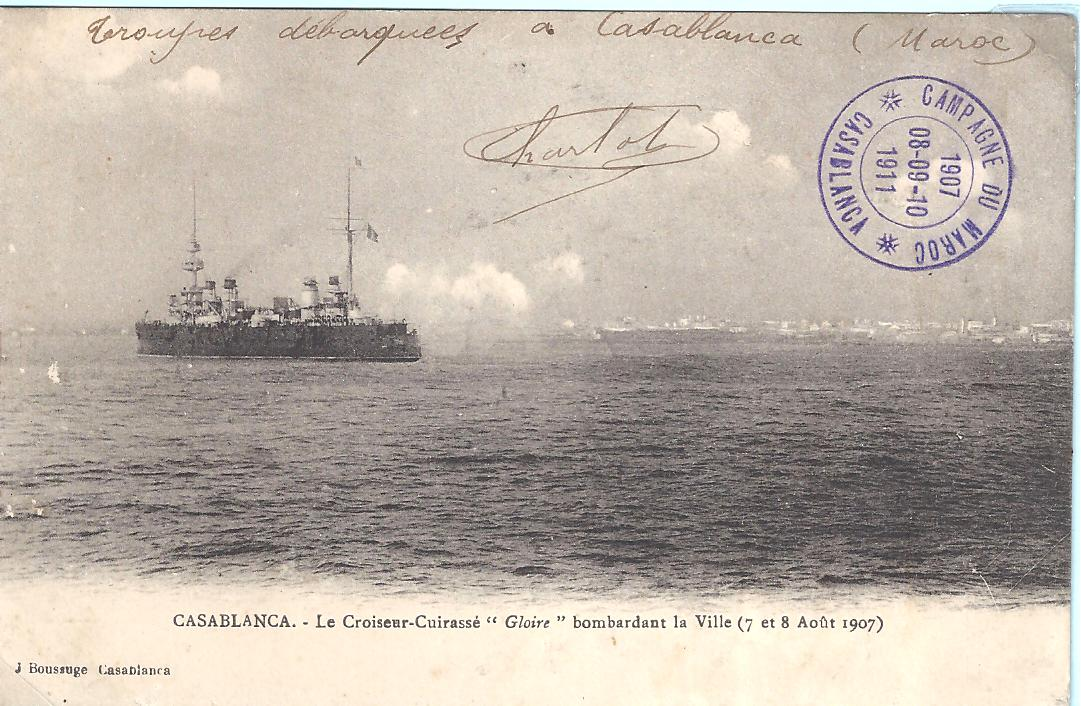
A postcard showing the French cruiser Gloire recoiling from firing artillery at the city during the bombardment of Casablanca August 1907

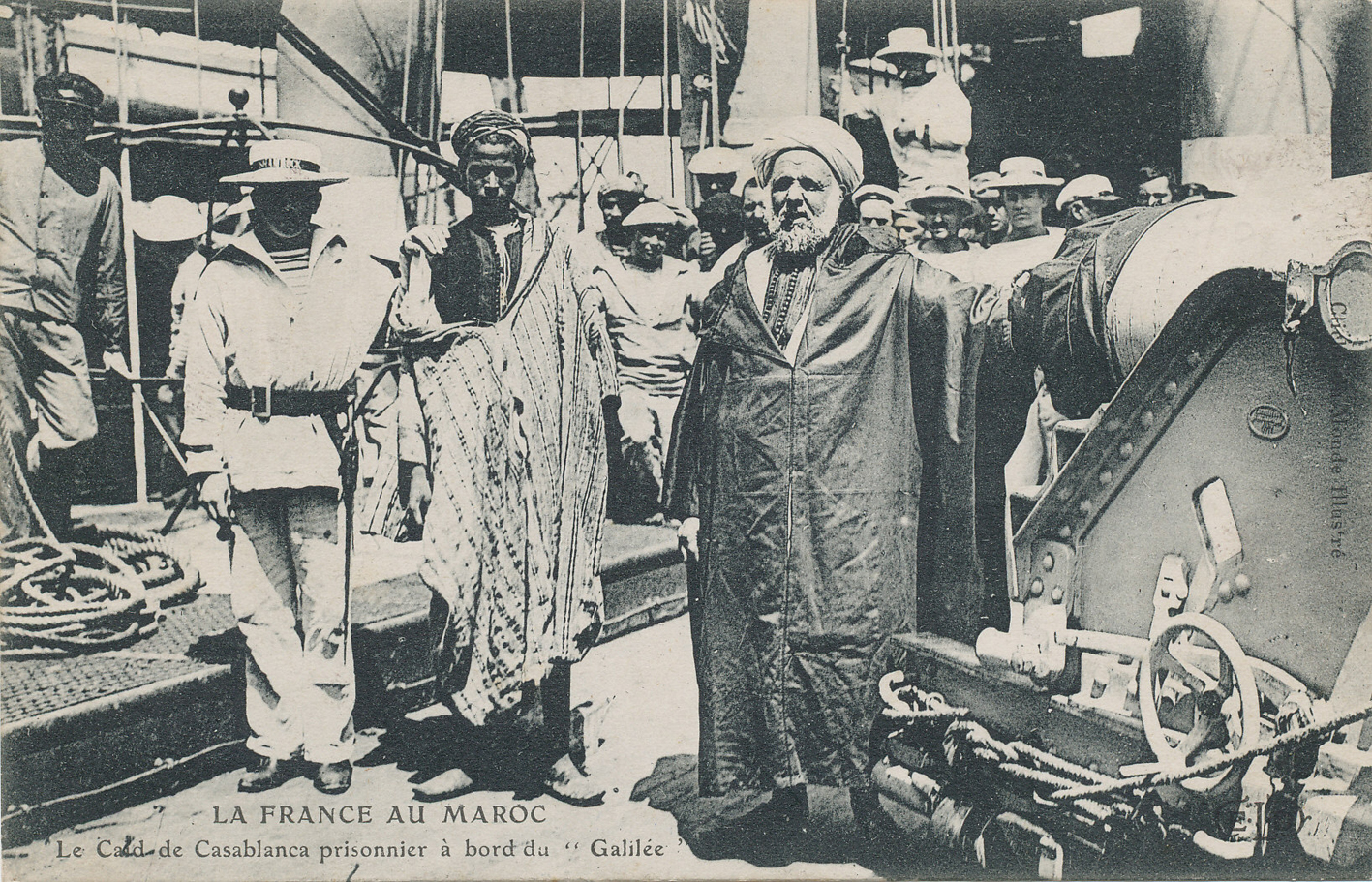
The Qaid of Casablanca, Si Boubker Ben Bouzid Slaoui, captive on the French cruiser Galilée

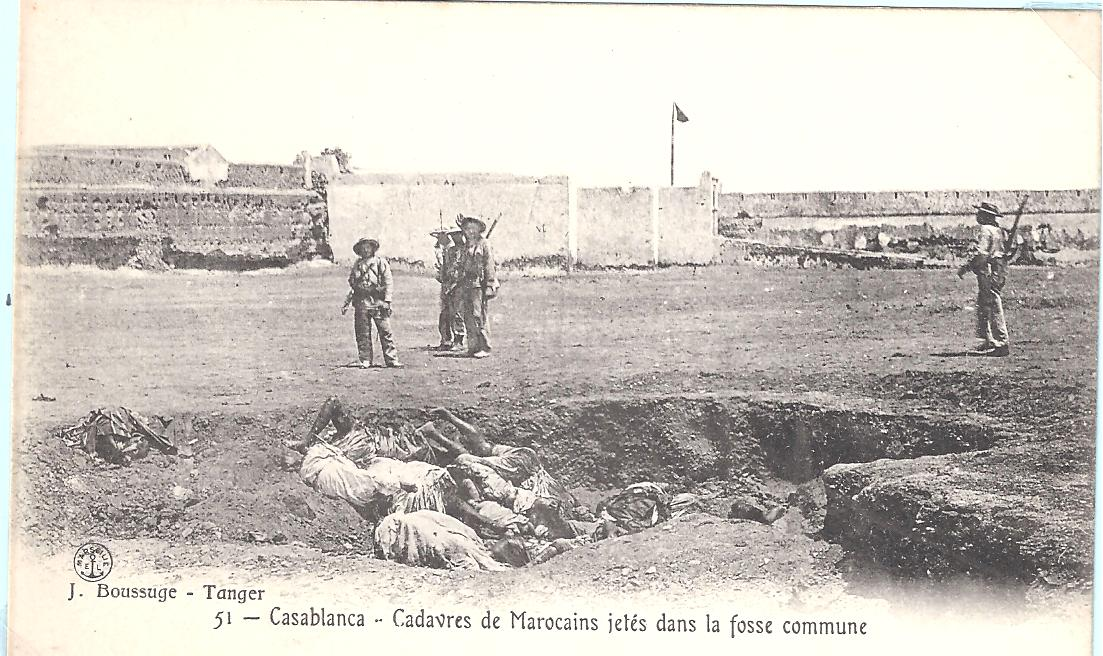
Moroccan corpses in a mass grave in 1907

=== French rule and influence ===
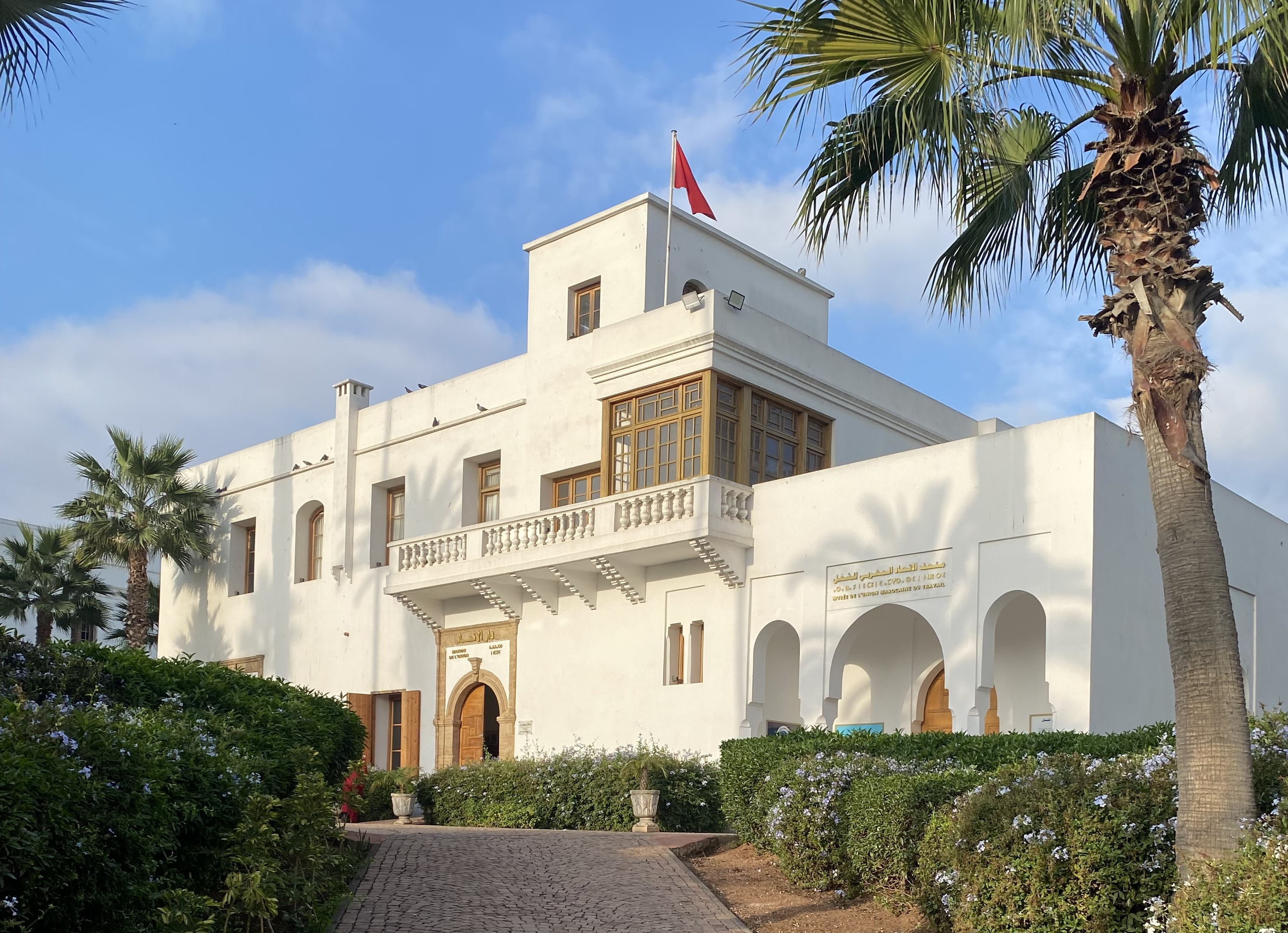
Résidence or mansion erected for Hubert Lyautey in the Medina shortly after the establishment of the protectorate, designed by architect Pierre Bousquet

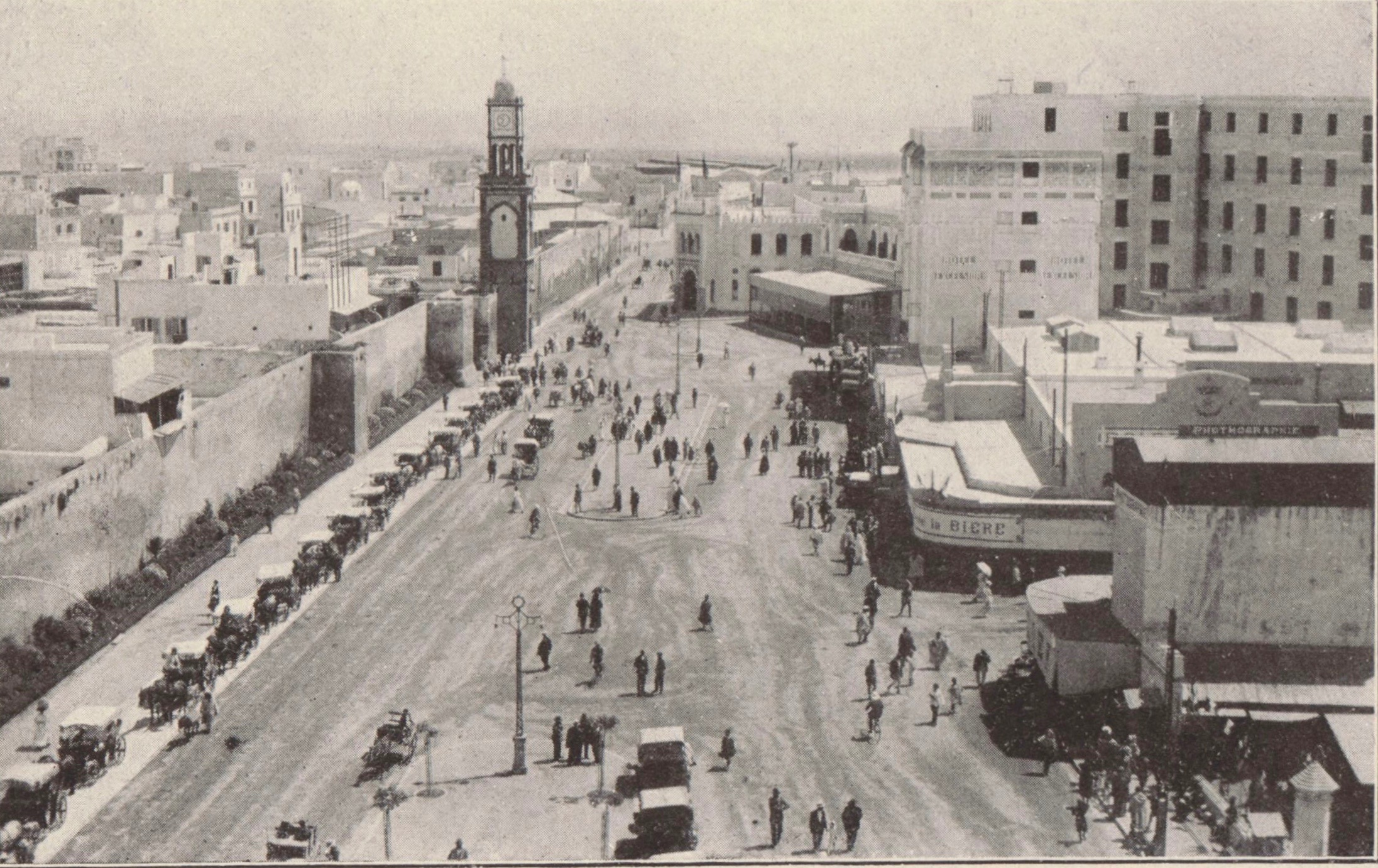
Place de France (now United Nations Square) in 1917. With its landmark Clock Tower, this space became a contact point between what the colonists called the ville indigène to the left—comprising the Medina and Mellah—and the European nouvelle ville to the right.

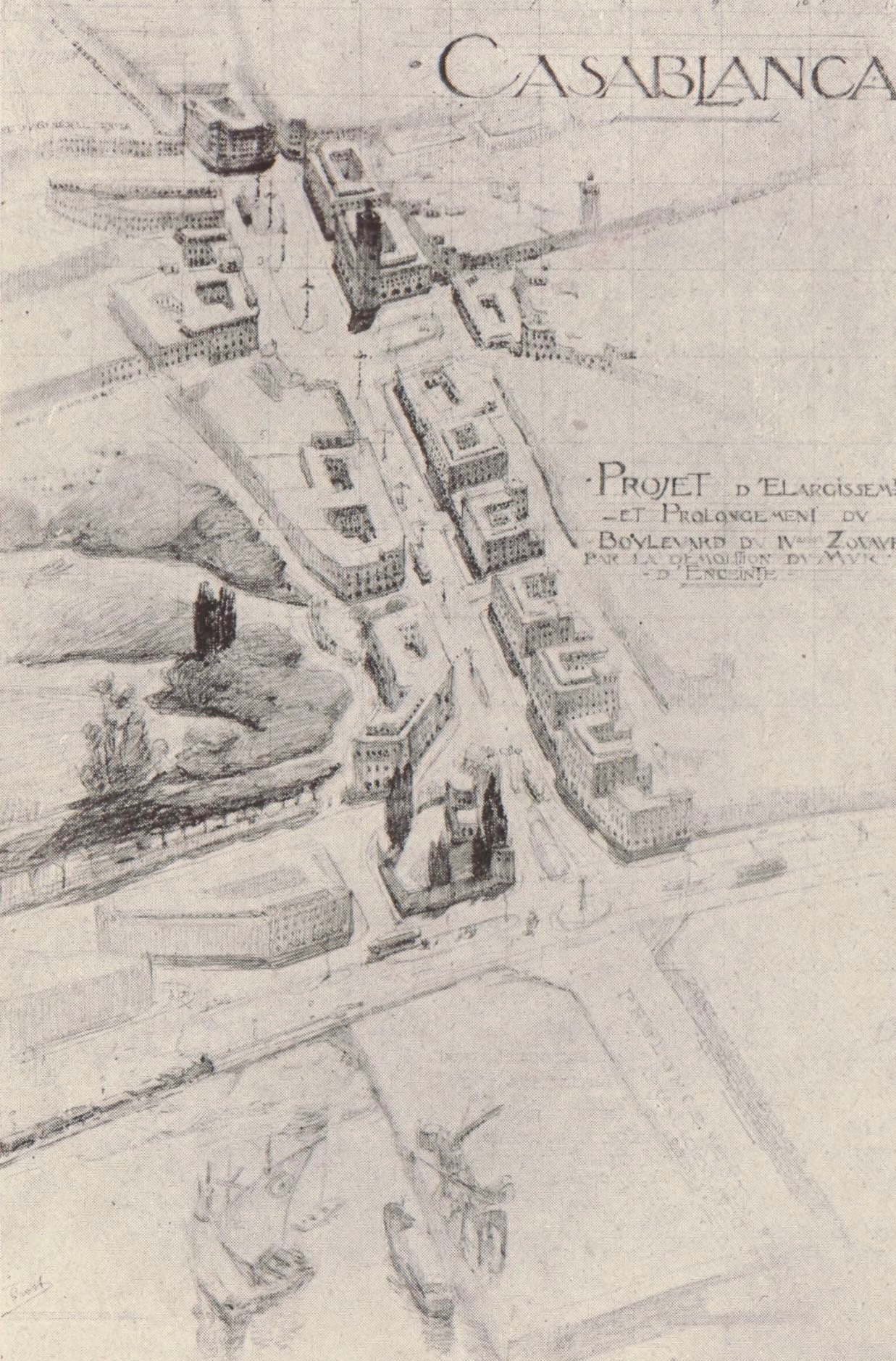
Henri Prost's plans to extend 4ème Zouaves Street (now Félix Houphouët-Boigny Street) from the port to the Place de France (now United Nations Square), part of his redesigns of Casablanca's urban landscape

French control of Casablanca was formalized March 1912 when the Treaty of Fez established the French Protectorat. Under French imperial control, Casablanca became a port of colonial extraction.

Right at the beginning of the twentieth century, when Morocco was officially declared a French protectorate, the French decided to shift power to Morocco's coastal areas (i.e. Rabat and Casablanca) at the expense of its interior areas (i.e. Fez and Marrakesh). Rabat was made the administrative capital of the country, and Casablanca its economic capital.

General Hubert Lyautey assigned the planning of the new colonial port city to Henri Prost. As he did in other Moroccan cities, Prost designed a European ville nouvelle outside the walls of the medina. In Casablanca, he also designed a new "ville indigène" to house Moroccans arriving from other cities.

Europeans formed almost half the population of Casablanca.

A 1937–1938 typhoid fever outbreak was exploited by colonial authorities to justify the appropriation of urban spaces in Casablanca. Moroccans residing in informal housing were cleared out of the center and displaced, notably to Carrières Centrales.

=== World War II ===
After Philippe Pétain of France signed the armistice with the Nazis, he ordered French troops in France's colonial empire to defend French territory against any aggressors—Allied or otherwise—applying a policy of "asymmetrical neutrality" in favour of the Germans. French colonists in Morocco generally supported Pétain, while Moroccans tended to favour de Gaulle and the Allies.

Operation Torch, which started on 8 November 1942, was the British-American invasion of French North Africa during the North African campaign of World War II. The Western Task Force, composed of American units led by Major General George S. Patton and Rear Admiral Henry Kent Hewitt, carried out the invasions of Mehdia, Fedhala, and Asfi. American forces captured Casablanca from Vichy control when France surrendered 11 November 1942, but the Naval Battle of Casablanca continued until American forces sank German submarine U-173 on 16 November.

Casablanca was the site of the Berrechid Airfield, a large American air base used as the staging area for all American aircraft for the European theatre of World War II. The airfield has since become Mohammed V International Airport.

=== Anfa Conference ===
Casablanca hosted the Anfa Conference (also called the Casablanca Conference) in January 1943. Prime Minister Winston Churchill and President Franklin D. Roosevelt discussed the progress of the war. Also in attendance were the Free France generals Charles de Gaulle and Henri Giraud, though they played minor roles and didn't participate in the military planning.

It was at this conference that the Allies adopted the doctrine of "unconditional surrender", meaning that the Axis powers would be fought until their defeat. Roosevelt also met privately with Sultan Muhammad V and expressed his support for Moroccan independence after the war. This became a turning point, as Moroccan nationalists were emboldened to openly seek complete independence.

=== Toward independence ===
During the 1940s and 1950s, Casablanca was a major centre of anti-French rioting.

On 7 April 1947, a massacre of working class Moroccans, carried out by Senegalese Tirailleurs in the service of the French colonial army, was instigated just as Sultan Muhammed V was due to make a speech in Tangier appealing for independence.

Riots in Casablanca took place from 7–8 December 1952, in response to the assassination of the Tunisian labor unionist Farhat Hached by La Main Rouge—the clandestine militant wing of French intelligence. Then, on 25 December 1953 (Christmas Day), Muhammad Zarqtuni orchestrated a bombing of Casablanca's Central Market in response to the forced exile of Sultan Muhammad V and the royal family on 20 August (Eid al-Adha) of that year.

=== Since independence ===
Morocco gained independence from France in 1956.

=== Casablanca Group ===
On 4–7 January 1961, the city hosted an ensemble of progressive African leaders during the Casablanca Conference of 1961. Among those received by King Muhammad V were Gamal Abdel Nasser, Kwame Nkrumah, Modibo Keïta, and Ahmed Sékou Touré, Ferhat Abbas.

=== Jewish emigration ===
Casablanca was a major departure point for Jews leaving Morocco through Cadima (1949–1956) and Operation Yachin (1961–1964).

=== 1965 riots ===
The 1965 student protests organized by the National Union of Popular Forces-affiliated National Union of Moroccan Students, which spread to cities around the country and devolved into riots, started on 22 March 1965, in front of Lycée Mohammed V in Casablanca. The protests started as a peaceful march to demand the right to public higher education for Morocco, but expanded to include concerns of labourers, the unemployed, and other marginalized segments of society, and devolved into vandalism and rioting. The riots were violently repressed by security forces with tanks and armoured vehicles; Moroccan authorities reported a dozen deaths while the UNFP reported more than 1,000. This violent suppression happened under the minister of interior Mohamed Oufkir's direction. He personally machine-gunned rioters from his helicopter.

King Hassan II blamed the events on teachers and parents, and declared in a speech to the nation on 30 March 1965: "There is no greater danger to the State than a so-called intellectual. It would have been better if you were all illiterate."

=== 1981 riots ===
On 6 June 1981, the Casablanca Bread Riots took place, which were sparked by a sharp increase in the price of necessities such as butter, sugar, wheat flour, and cooking oil following a period of severe drought. Hassan II appointed the French-trained interior minister Driss Basri as hardliner, who would later become a symbol of the Years of Lead, with quelling the protests. The government stated that 66 people were killed and 100 were injured, while opposition leaders put the number of dead at 637, saying that many of these were killed by police and army gunfire.

=== Mudawana ===
In March 2000, more than 60 women's groups organized demonstrations in Casablanca proposing reforms to the legal status of women in the country. About 40,000 women attended, calling for a ban on polygamy and the introduction of divorce law (divorce being a purely religious procedure at that time). Although the counter-demonstration attracted half a million participants, the movement for change started in 2000 was influential on King Mohammed VI, and he enacted a new mudawana, or family law, in early 2004, meeting some of the demands of women's rights activists.

=== Further history ===
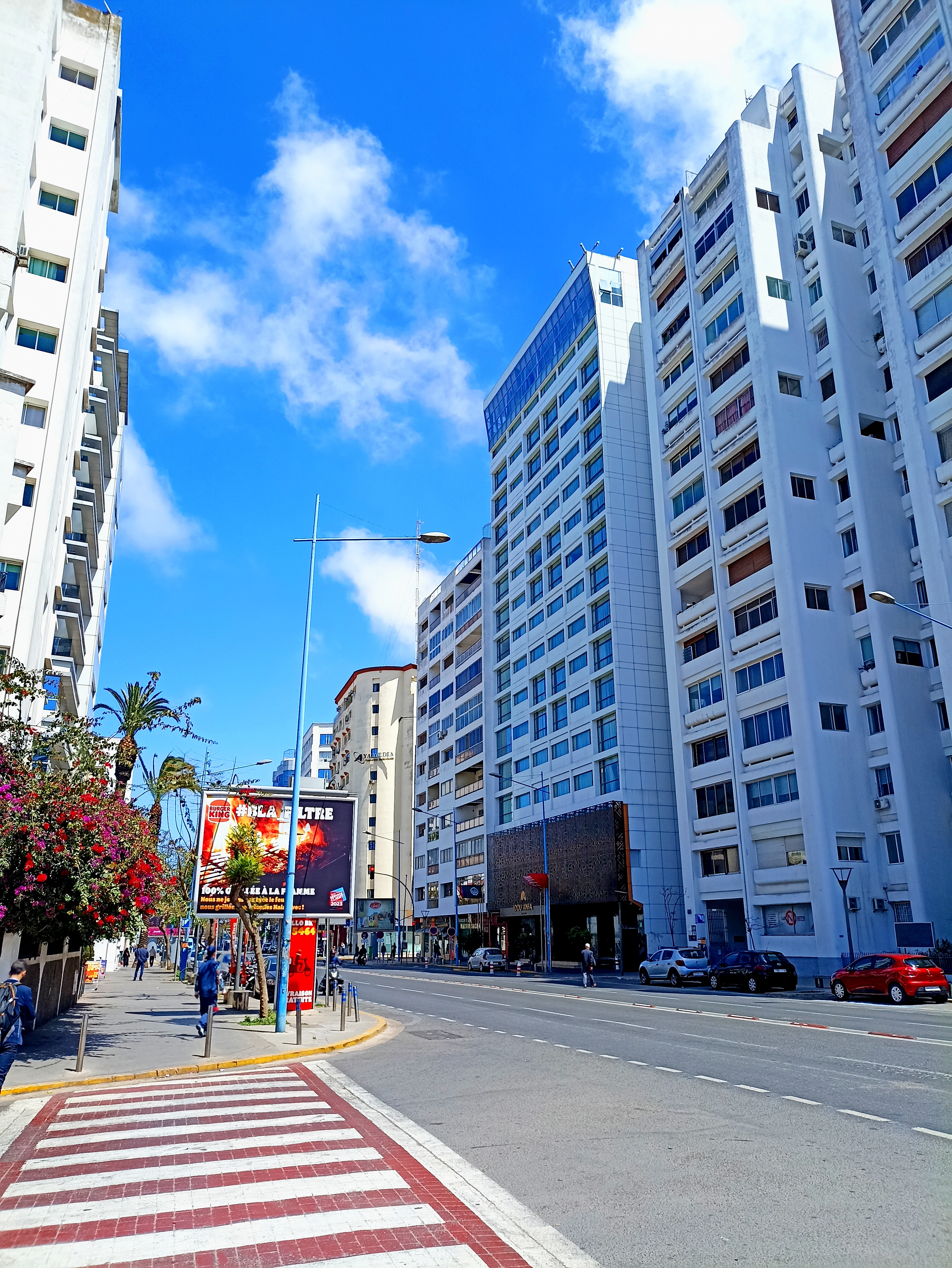
Casablanca experienced increased economic growth in the early 2020s due to concentration of private capital.

On 16 May 2003, 33 civilians were killed, and more than 100 people were injured when Casablanca was hit by a multiple suicide bomb attack carried out by Moroccans and claimed by some to have been linked to al-Qaeda. Twelve suicide bombers struck five locations in the city.

Another series of suicide bombings struck the city in early 2007. These events illustrated some of the persistent challenges the city faces in addressing poverty and integrating disadvantaged neighbourhoods and populations. One initiative to improve conditions in the city's disadvantaged neighbourhoods was the creation of the Sidi Moumen Cultural Center.

As calls for reform spread through the Arab world in 2011, Moroccans joined in, but concessions by the ruler led to acceptance. However, in December, thousands of people demonstrated in several parts of the city, especially the city center near la Fontaine, desiring more significant political reforms. On 1 November 2023, Casablanca along with Ouarzazate joined UNESCO's Creative Cities Network.

In late 2024, local authorities launched an accelerated clearance initiative aiming to eradicate the city's remaining shantytowns by 2028. Overseen by the regional prefecture, the project targets the relocation of approximately 63,000 households from informal settlements such as Douar Abdellah Belhaj in Aïn Sebaâ into newly constructed apartment complexes or serviced plots. The redevelopment program forms part of wider preparations for the 2030 FIFA World Cup, focusing on replacing substandard dwellings with modern housing infrastructure across the metropolitan area.

== Geography ==
View of the Atlantic Ocean

Casablanca is located on the Atlantic coast of the Chaouia Plains, which have historically been the breadbasket of Morocco. Apart from the Atlantic coast, the Bouskoura forest is the only natural attraction in the city. The forest was planted in the 20th century and consists mostly of eucalyptus, palm, and pine trees. It is located about 18.4 km from the cities international airport.

The only watercourse in Casablanca is oued Bouskoura, a small seasonal creek that until 1912 reached the Atlantic Ocean near the actual port. Most of the Oued Bouskoura river's bed has been covered due to urbanization, and only the part south of El Jadida road can now be seen. The closest permanent river to Casablanca is Oum Rabia, 70 km (43.50 mi) to the south-east.

=== Neighbourhoods ===
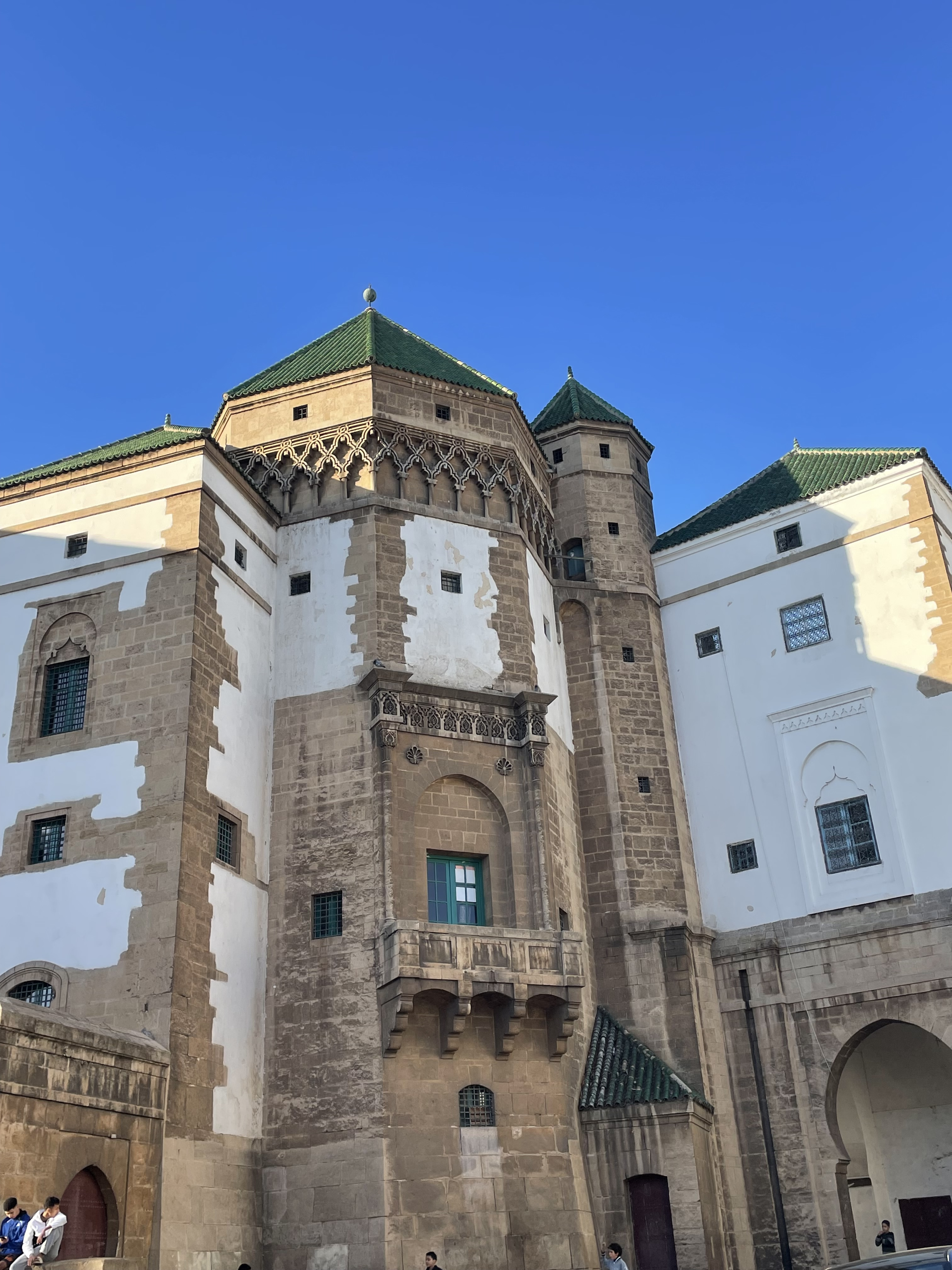
Mahkamat al-Pasha, Habous

The list of neighbourhoods is indicative and not complete:

- 2 Mars
- Ain Chock
- Ain Diab
- Ain Sebaa
- Attacharouk
- Belvédère
- Beauséjour
- Bouchentouf
- Bouskoura
- Bourgogne
- Californie
- Centre Ville
- C.I.L.
- La Colline
- Derb Ghallef
- Derb Sultan
- Derb Tazi
- Gauthier
- Ghandi
- Habous
- El Hank
- Hay Dakhla
- Hay El Baraka
- Hay El Hanaa
- Hay El Hassani
- Hay El Mohammadi
- Hay Farah
- Hay Moulay Rachid
- Hay Salama
- Inara
- Laimoun (Hay Hassani)
- Lamkansa
- Lissasfa
- Maârif
- Mers Sultan
- Nassim
- Oasis
- Old Madina
- Oulfa
- Palmiers
- Polo
- Racine
- Riviera
- Roches Noires
- Salmia 2
- Sbata
- Sidi Bernoussi
- Sidi Maârouf
- Sidi Moumen
- Sidi Othmane

=== Climate ===
Casablanca has a hot-summer Mediterranean climate (Köppen climate classification Csa), bordering on hot semi-arid climate (Köppen climate classification BSh). The cool Canary Current off the Atlantic coast moderates temperature variation, which results in a climate remarkably similar to that of coastal Los Angeles, with similar temperature ranges. The city has an annual average of 72 days with significant precipitation, which amounts to 412 mm (16.2 in) per year. The highest and lowest temperatures ever recorded in the city are 40.5 °C (104.9 °F) and −2.7 °C (27.1 °F), respectively. The highest amount of rainfall recorded in a single day is 178 mm (7.0 in) on 30 November 2010.

Climate data for Casablanca (1991–2020 normals, extremes 1941–present)
Month	Jan	Feb	Mar	Apr	May	Jun	Jul	Aug	Sep	Oct	Nov	Dec	Year
Record high °C (°F)	31.3 (88.3)	35.3 (95.5)	37.3 (99.1)	37.0 (98.6)	38.6 (101.5)	40.5 (104.9)	42.2 (108.0)	40.8 (105.4)	40.6 (105.1)	37.8 (100.0)	35.0 (95.0)	30.3 (86.5)	42.2 (108.0)
Mean daily maximum °C (°F)	17.6 (63.7)	18.1 (64.6)	19.7 (67.5)	20.6 (69.1)	22.7 (72.9)	24.6 (76.3)	26.1 (79.0)	26.7 (80.1)	25.9 (78.6)	24.3 (75.7)	21.0 (69.8)	18.9 (66.0)	22.2 (72.0)
Daily mean °C (°F)	13.3 (55.9)	13.9 (57.0)	15.7 (60.3)	17.0 (62.6)	19.4 (66.9)	21.7 (71.1)	23.3 (73.9)	23.9 (75.0)	22.7 (72.9)	20.6 (69.1)	17.0 (62.6)	14.7 (58.5)	18.6 (65.5)
Mean daily minimum °C (°F)	8.9 (48.0)	9.7 (49.5)	11.6 (52.9)	13.3 (55.9)	15.9 (60.6)	18.7 (65.7)	20.5 (68.9)	21.0 (69.8)	19.5 (67.1)	16.8 (62.2)	12.8 (55.0)	10.5 (50.9)	14.9 (58.8)
Record low °C (°F)	−1.5 (29.3)	0.3 (32.5)	2.8 (37.0)	5.0 (41.0)	7.2 (45.0)	10.0 (50.0)	12.0 (53.6)	13.0 (55.4)	10.8 (51.4)	7.0 (44.6)	2.0 (35.6)	1.0 (33.8)	−1.5 (29.3)
Average precipitation mm (inches)	61.9 (2.44)	49.7 (1.96)	42.5 (1.67)	33.5 (1.32)	13.6 (0.54)	2.5 (0.10)	0.5 (0.02)	0.4 (0.02)	11.7 (0.46)	45.3 (1.78)	84.4 (3.32)	62.2 (2.45)	408.2 (16.07)
Average precipitation days (≥ 1.0 mm)	6.5	6.1	6.0	4.7	2.2	0.7	0.1	0.0	1.8	5.1	6.7	6.5	46.4
Average relative humidity (%)	83	83	82	80	79	81	82	83	83	82	82	84	82
Mean monthly sunshine hours	203.0	200.0	246.8	269.4	305.4	296.0	305.1	297.2	263.1	240.8	208.0	195.2	3,030
Percentage possible sunshine	60	61	65	67	70	74	75	76	73	68	62	59	68
Average ultraviolet index	3	4	6	8	9	10	10	10	8	5	4	3	7
Source 1: NOAA (sun 1981–2010), (April, June record high)
Source 2: Deutscher Wetterdienst (humidity 1949–1993, extremes 1941–1993) and Weather atlas (UV index)

Casablanca mean sea temperature
Jan	Feb	Mar	Apr	May	Jun	Jul	Aug	Sep	Oct	Nov	Dec
17.5 °C (63.5 °F)	17.0 °C (62.6 °F)	17.1 °C (62.8 °F)	18.4 °C (65.1 °F)	19.5 °C (67.1 °F)	21.8 °C (71.2 °F)	22.7 °C (72.9 °F)	23.3 °C (73.9 °F)	23.1 °C (73.6 °F)	22.5 °C (72.5 °F)	20.4 °C (68.7 °F)	18.5 °C (65.3 °F)

=== Climate change ===
A 2019 paper published in PLOS One estimated that under Representative Concentration Pathway 4.5, a "moderate" scenario of climate change where global warming reaches ~2.5–3 °C (4.5–5.4 °F) by 2100, the climate of Casablanca in the year 2050 would most closely resemble the current climate of Tripoli, Libya. The annual temperature would increase by 1.7 °C (3.1 °F), and the temperature of the warmest month by 1.6 °C (2.9 °F), while the temperature of the coldest month would actually decrease by 0.2 °C (0.36 °F).

Moreover, according to the 2022 IPCC Sixth Assessment Report, Casablanca is one of 12 major African cities (Abidjan, Alexandria, Algiers, Cape Town, Casablanca, Dakar, Dar es Salaam, Durban, Lagos, Lomé, Luanda and Maputo) which would be the most severely affected by future sea level rise. It estimates that they would collectively sustain cumulative damage of US$65 billion under RCP 4.5 and US$86.5 billion for the high-emission scenario RCP 8.5 by the year 2050. Additionally, RCP 8.5 combined with the hypothetical impact from marine ice sheet instability at high levels of warming would involve up to US$137.5 billion in damage, while the additional accounting for the "low-probability, high-damage events" may increase aggregate risks to US$187 billion for the "moderate" RCP4.5, US$206 billion for RCP8.5 and US$397 billion under the high-end ice sheet instability scenario. Since sea level rise would continue for about 10,000 years under every scenario of climate change, future costs of sea level rise would only increase, especially without adaptation measures.

== Economy ==
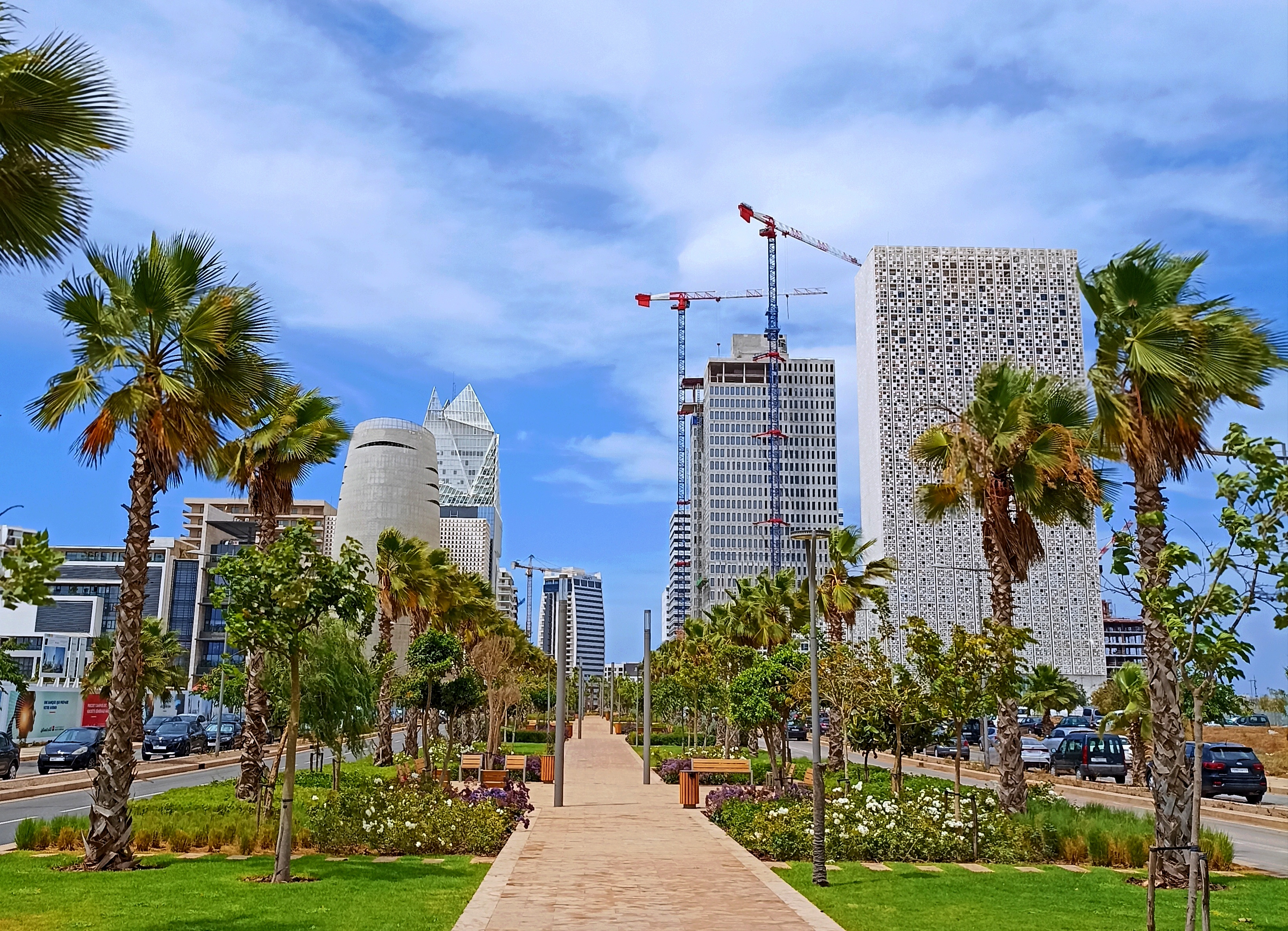
Casablanca Finance City

Technopark

Marina Shopping Center

The city hosts the Technopark, a hub for IT companies and startups specializing in digital content and video gaming in Morocco. Several national agencies are headquartered in Casablanca, including the Moroccan Office of Industrial and Commercial Property (OMPIC). The city hosts the headquarters of the National Ports Agency. The Grand Casablanca region is considered the locomotive of the development of the Moroccan economy. It attracts 32% of the country's production units and 56% of industrial labor. The region uses 30% of the national electricity production. With MAD 93 billion, the region contributes to 44% of the industrial production of the kingdom. About 33% of national industrial exports, MAD 27 billion, comes from the Grand Casablanca: 30% of the Moroccan banking network is concentrated in Casablanca, headquartering major Moroccan banks; Attijariwafa Bank, BCP Group, BMCI, Crédit du Maroc, and Bank of Africa. These currently being fully Moroccanized, due to local corporations like the Holmarcom Group acquiring Crédit du Maroc from Société Générale, and negotiating with BNP Paribas to obtain its share capital of BMCI.

One of the most important exports of Casablanca is phosphate. Other industries include fishing, fish canning, sawmills, furniture production, building materials, glass, textiles, electronics, leather work, processed food, spirits, soft drinks, and cigarettes.

The Casablanca and Mohammedia seaports activity represent 50% of the international commercial flows of Morocco. Almost the entire Casablanca waterfront is under development, mainly the construction of huge entertainment centres between the port and Hassan II Mosque, the Anfa Resort project near the business, entertainment and living centre of Megarama, the shopping and entertainment complex of Morocco Mall, as well as a complete renovation of the coastal walkway. The Sindbad park was also renewed with rides, games and entertainment services.

Casablanca is a significant financial centre, ranking 38th globally in the September 2026 Global Financial Centres Index rankings, between Kuala Lumpur and GIFT City-Gujarat. The Casablanca Stock Exchange is Africa's third-largest in terms of market capitalization, as of December 2022.

Royal Air Maroc has its head office at the previous Casablanca-Anfa Airport location. In 2004, it announced that it was moving its head office from Casablanca to a location in Province of Nouaceur, close to Mohammed V International Airport. The agreement to build the head office in Nouaceur was signed in 2009 but was never implemented.

== Administration and politics ==
Casablanca Commune's council office

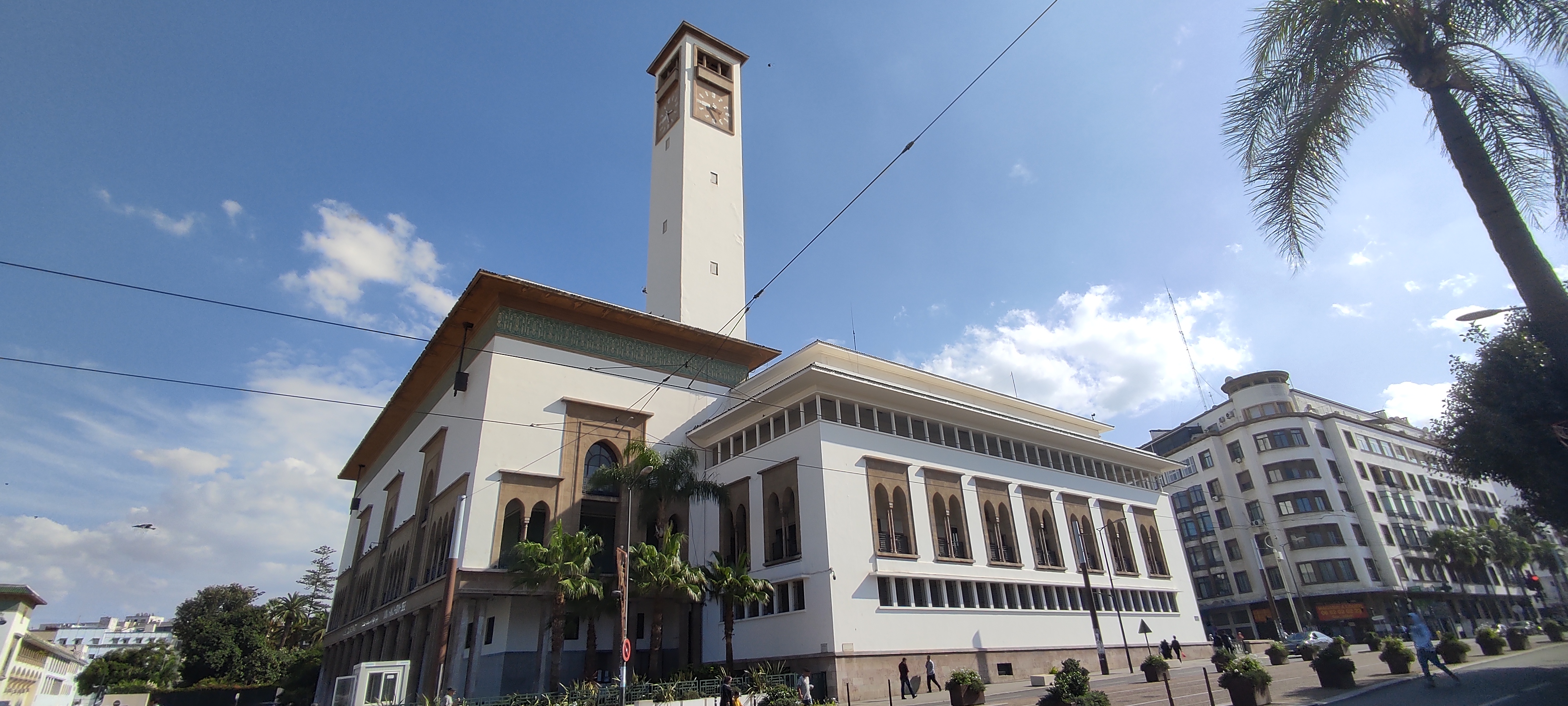
Casablanca-Settat region Wilaya Building

Casablanca is a municipality that is part of the Casablanca-Settat region.

The municipality is divided into 16 districts (arrondissements).

=== Municipality ===
The responsibilities of the Casablanca municipality include :

- Economic and social development
- Traffic, Roads, Sidewalks, Bike Lanes
- Parking
- Public Transit
- The environment
- Parks
- Beaches
- Public Safety
- Hygiene
- Libraries
- Museums
- Cultural Events
- Kindergartens
- Cemeteries

==== Mayor ====
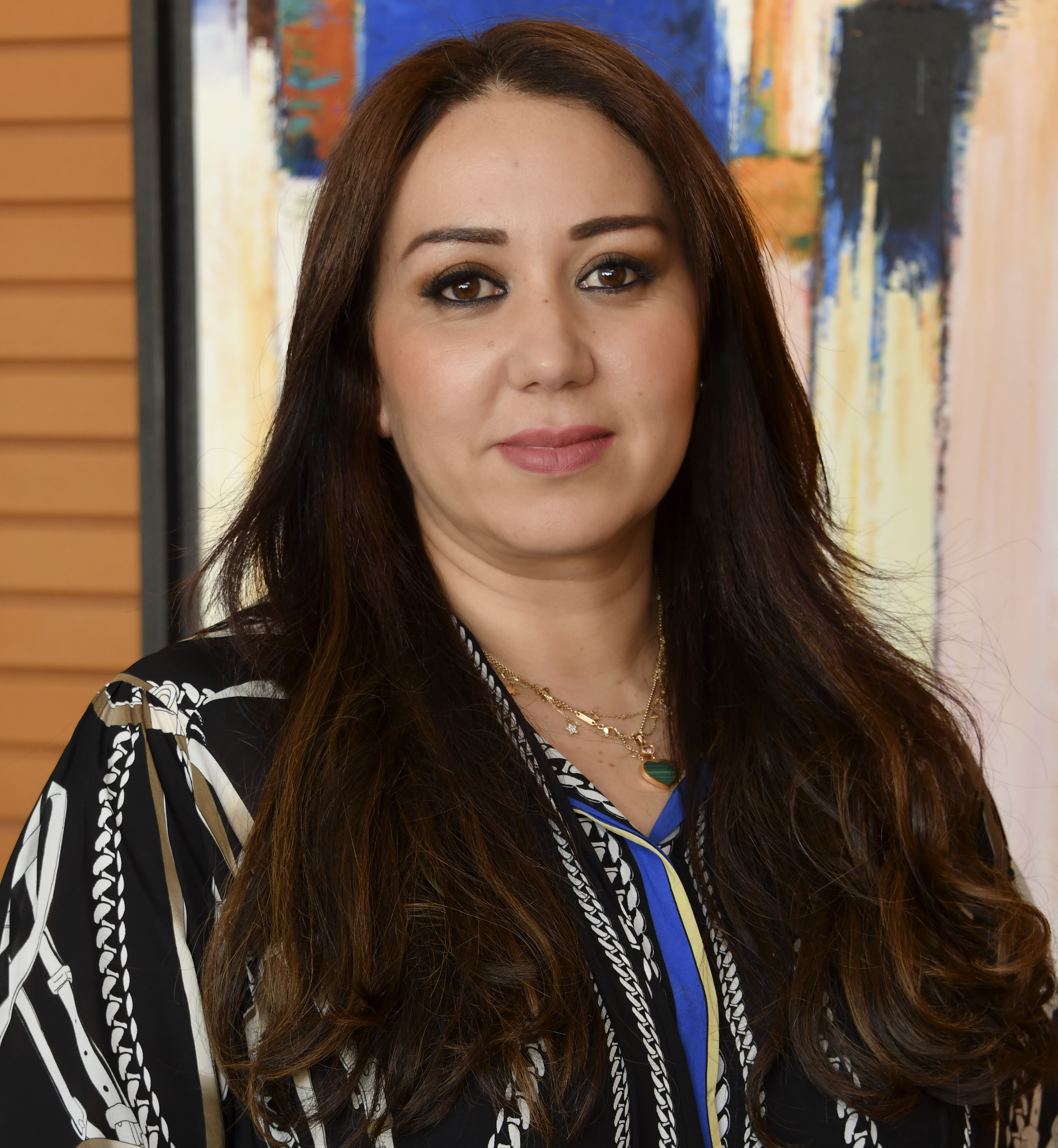
Nabila Rmili, current mayor of Casablanca

The mayor of Casablanca is the head of the Casablanca municipality. The mayor controls the Casablanca municipality administration.

The mayor :

- Represents the city
- Sits on the board of public development societies (SDL)
- Must execute the budget voted by the city ouncil
- Must answer questions from the council members
- Must ask the council for approval before signing any partnership with the private sector
- Meets the leader of the 16 districts to receive suggestion
- Can sue on behalf of the Municipality of Casablanca
- Can create a police force that focuses on public hygiene and public order
- Can be removed by the majority of the council

=== City Council ===
The mayor is accountable to the city council, which represents a total of 100 to 130 elected citizens from every Casablanca neighbourhood.

The city council meets each year in February, May, and October. These three meetings are mandatory according to Moroccan law.

The council members are informed 10 days before the meetings.

Apart from these three sessions, the council can also be summoned by:

- The mayor
- The wali of Casablanca
- 1/3 of the council members

At the end of every council session, a record of the votes must be preserved by a aecretary.

=== 16 districts (arrondissements) ===
The municipality of Casablanca is divided into 16 local districts (arrondissements).

1. Anfa (أنفا)	5. Hay Mohammadi (الحي المحمدي)	9. Aïn Sebaâ (عين السبع)	10. Hay Hassani (الحي الحسني)
2. Maârif (المعاريف)	6. Roches Noires (الصخور السوداء)	10. Mers Sultan (مرس السلطان)	14. Sidi Othmane (سيدي عثمان)
3. Sidi Belyout (سيدي بليوط)	8. Sidi Moumen (سيدي مومن)	11. Hay Mohammadi (الحي المحمدي)	15. Sbata (سباتة)
4. Sidi Bernoussi (سيدي برنوصي)	8. Moulay Rachid (مولاي رشيد)	12. Ben Msick (بن مسيك)	16. Ain Shock (عين الشق)

The 16 Arrondissements of Casablanca

According to Moroccan law, the main responsibilities of the districts include:

- Local parks
- Local green spaces
- Local cultural events
- Maintaining any cultural asset given to the district by the municipality

Each year, the 16 districts each receive a small budget from the municipality of Casablanca. However, they each determine how to use that budget. Each district has a president who is accountable to 15 to 20 district council members. For instance, the president of Anfa is accountable to the council of Anfa. Only people living in Anfa can vote for the Anfa council.

Each of the 16 local councils meets 3 times a year, in January, June, and September.

These three meetings are mandatory and generally open to the public.

The president of the 16 districts can ask the mayor of Casablanca to give them special powers.

=== District Prefecture ===
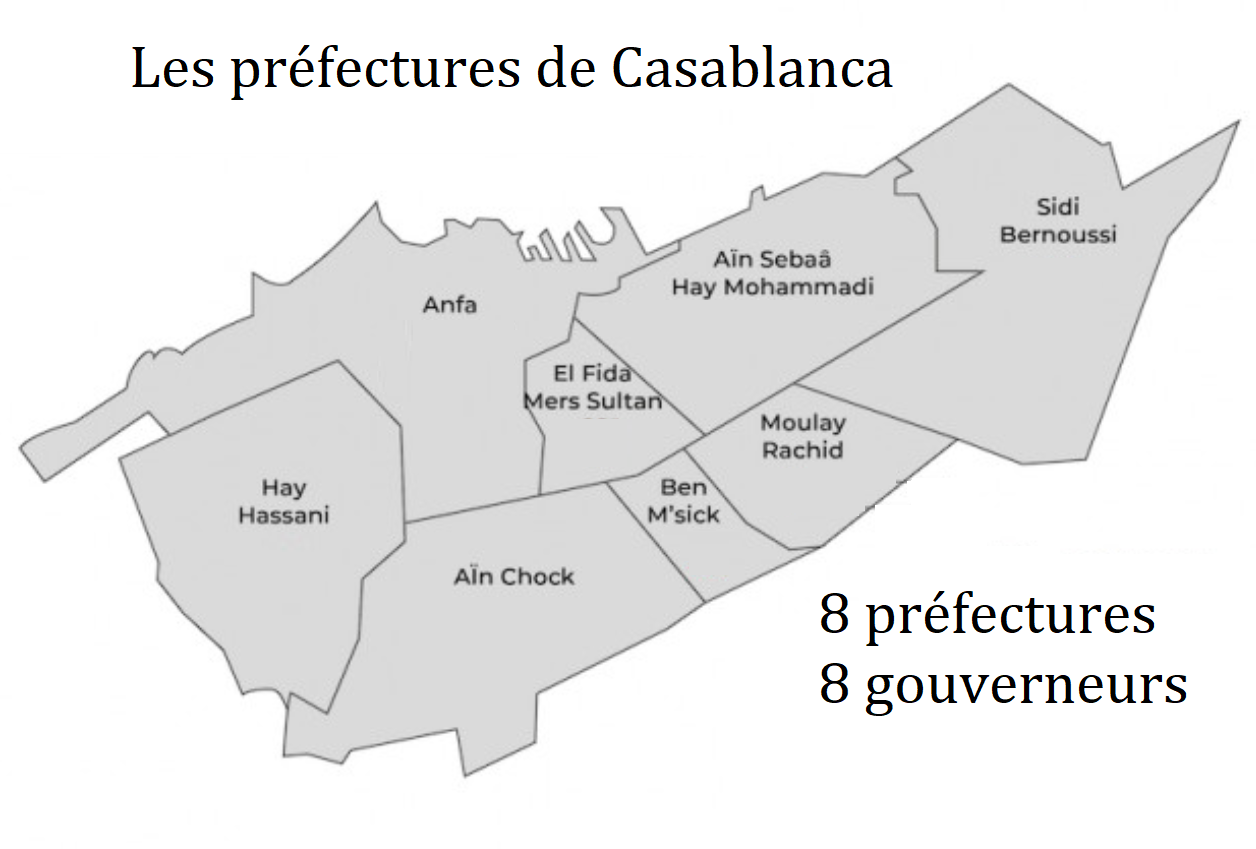
8 prefectures, 8 governors

Casablanca is divided into eight district prefectures. Each is led by a district governor (pasha) who is appointed by the Ministry of Interior.

A district governor or pasha typically oversees two or three districts. For instance, the governor of district prefecture of Casablanca-Anfa oversees Anfa, Sidi Belyout and Maarif.

District governors can cancel decisions voted by a council if the proper legal procedures were not respected. They can also ask a judge to remove a district president from office if he does not participate in council meetings.

== Demographics ==
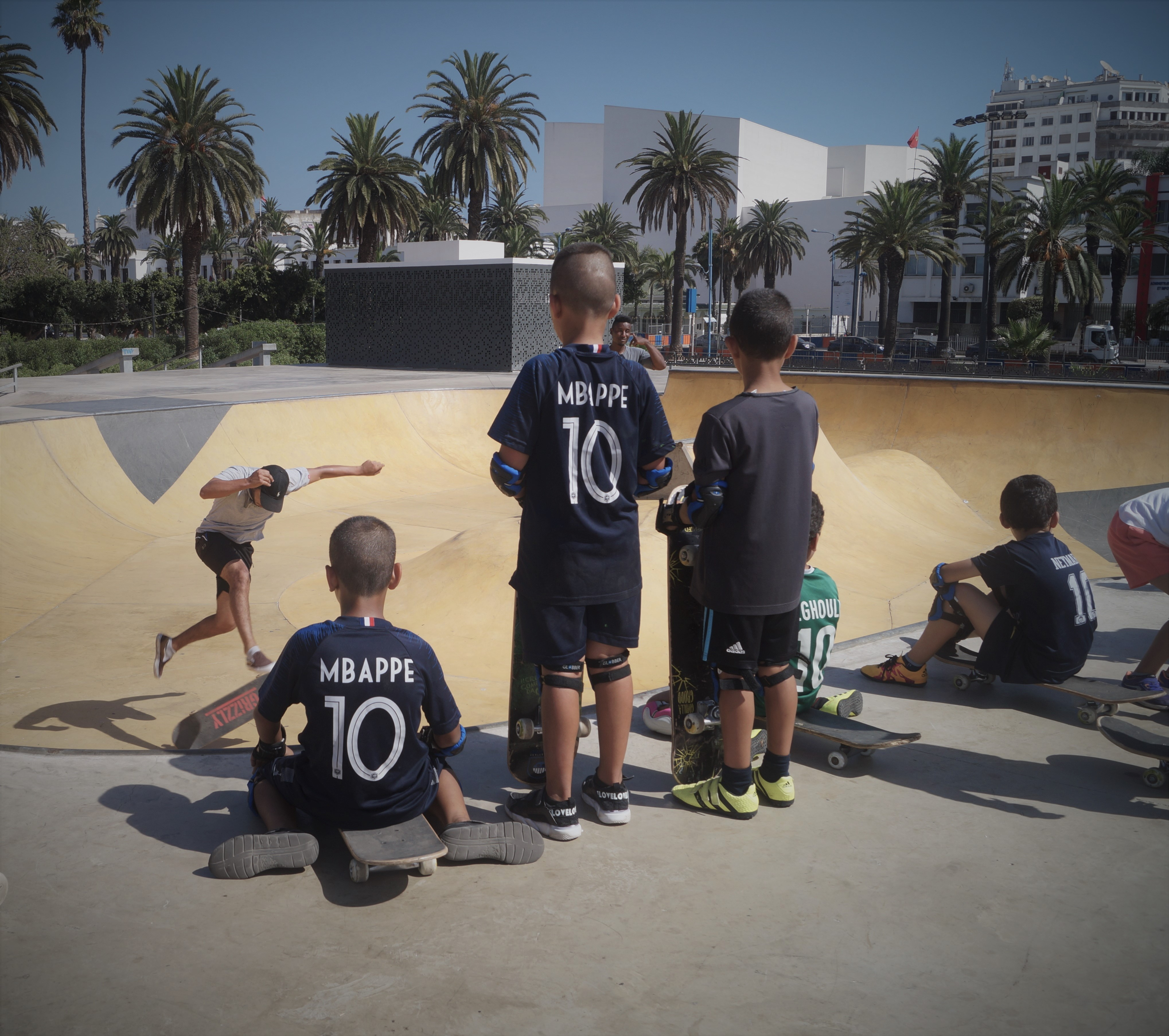
Children at a skatepark

The commune of Casablanca recorded a population of 3,218,036 in the 2024 Moroccan census. About 98% live in urban areas; around 25% of the population is under 15 years old, and 9% are over 60 years old. The population of the city proper is about 9% of the total population of Morocco. 99.9% of the population of Morocco are Arab and Berber Muslims. During the French protectorate in Morocco, European Christians formed almost half the population of Casablanca. Since Moroccan independence in 1956, the European population has decreased substantially. The city is still also home to a small community of Moroccan Christians, as well as a small group of foreign Roman Catholic and Protestant residents.

The population of Casablanca is made up of three main ethnocultural components: the ʕrubis, the Soussis and the Fessis. ʕrubis refer to the rural descendants of Bedouin tribes in the Atlantic Plains, Soussis also known as the Shilha people are Berbers primarily from the Souss region and Fessis refers to the distinguished families from Fez. Fessis make up the modern elite and urban bourgeoisie of Casablaca. The ʕrubis make up the bulk of the population.

=== Judaism in Casablanca ===
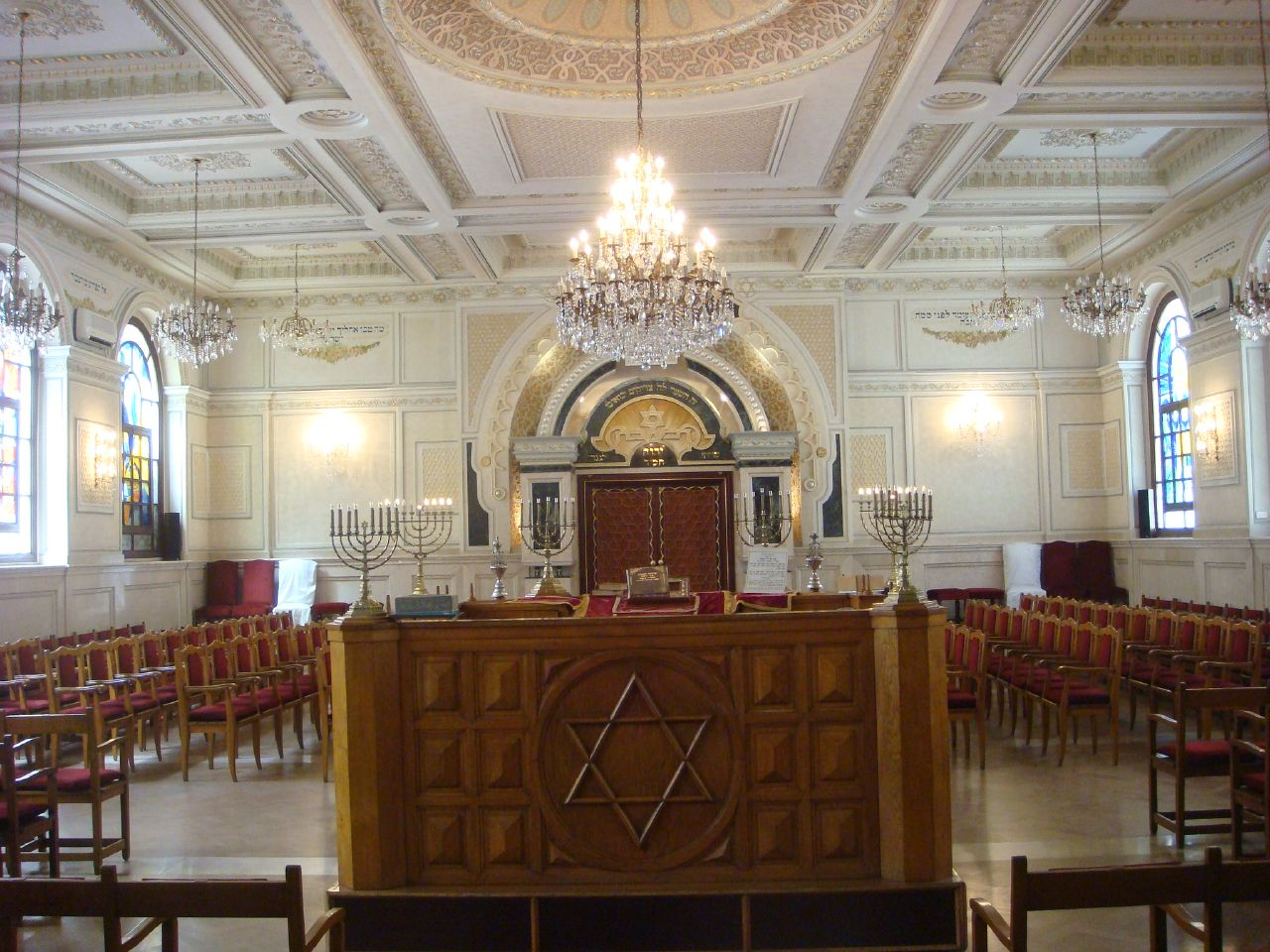
Inside Temple Beth-El in Casablanca

In the 20th century, Casablanca became the center of Jewish life in Morocco and home to the largest Jewish community in the Maghreb, with more than 80 synagogues and many Jewish social, cultural, and charitable organizations. In the 21st century, it is the largest Jewish community in the Arab world.

Jews have a long history in Casablanca. A Sephardic Jewish community was in Anfa up to the destruction of the city by the Portuguese in 1468. Jews were slow to return to the town, but by 1750, the Rabbi Elijah synagogue was built as the first Jewish synagogue in Casablanca. It was destroyed along with much of the town in the 1755 Lisbon earthquake.

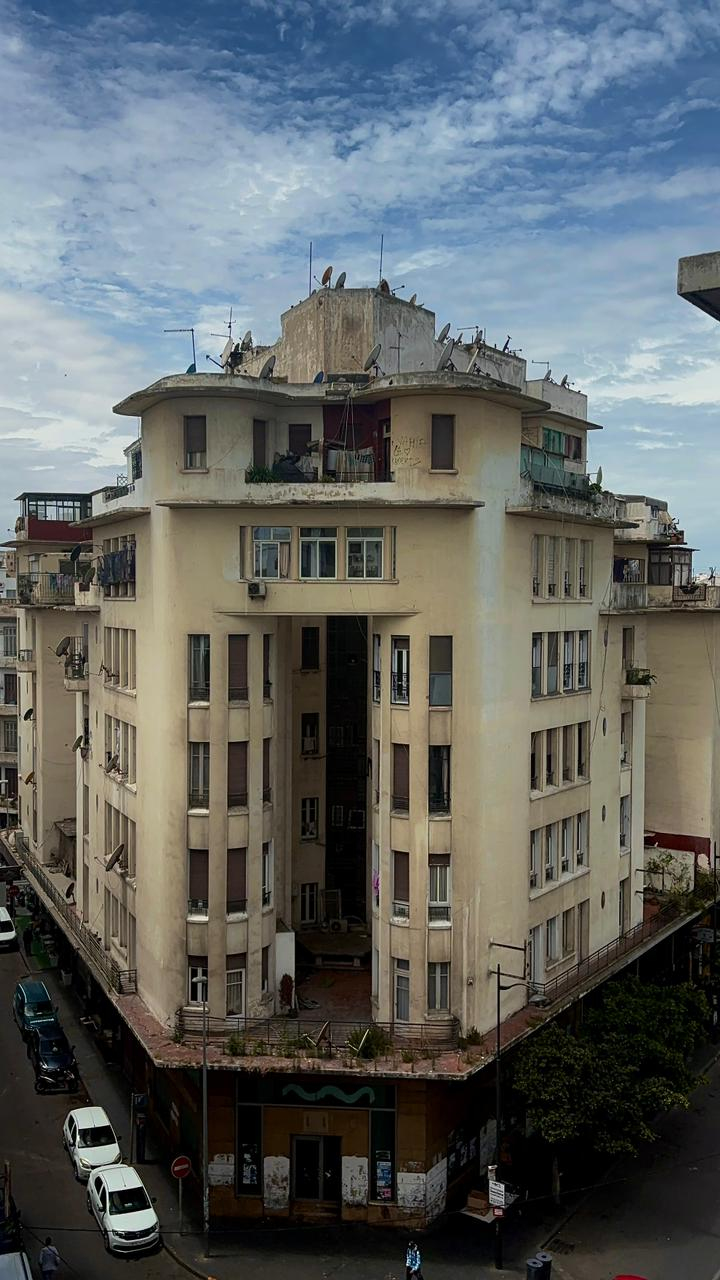
Lévy-Bendayan Building

In the mid-19th century, with commercial development through European economic penetration, industrial imports from Europe drove traditional Jewish crafts out of the market, costing many Jews in the interior their traditional livelihoods. Moroccan Jews started migrating from the interior to coastal cities such as Essaouira, Mazagan, Asfi, and later Casablanca for economic opportunity, participating in trade with Europeans and the development of those cities.

Casablanca's mellah was ravaged in the bombardment of Casablanca of 1907, the beginning of the French invasion of Morocco from the West.

Jean-Louis Cohen highlights the role of Jewish patrons in the architecture and urban development of Casablanca, particularly in the construction of the overwhelming majority of the city's tallest buildings during the interwar period. One notable example of this trend is the Lévy-Bendayan Building designed by Marius Boyer.

With the spread of Zionism in Morocco, approximately 28,000 Moroccan Jews immigrated to the State of Israel between 1948 and 1951, many through Casablanca. Casablanca then became a departure point in Operation Yachin, the covert Mossad-organized migration operation from 1961 to 1964. In 1956 there were 100,000 Jews registered in Casablanca. In 2018 it was estimated that there were only 2,500 Moroccan Jews living in Casablanca, while according to the World Jewish Congress there were only 1,000 Moroccan Jews remaining.

Today, the Jewish cemetery of Casablanca is one of the major cemeteries of the city, and many synagogues remain in service, but the city's Jewish community has dwindled. The Moroccan Jewish Museum is a museum established in the city in 1997.

== Education ==
=== Colleges and universities ===
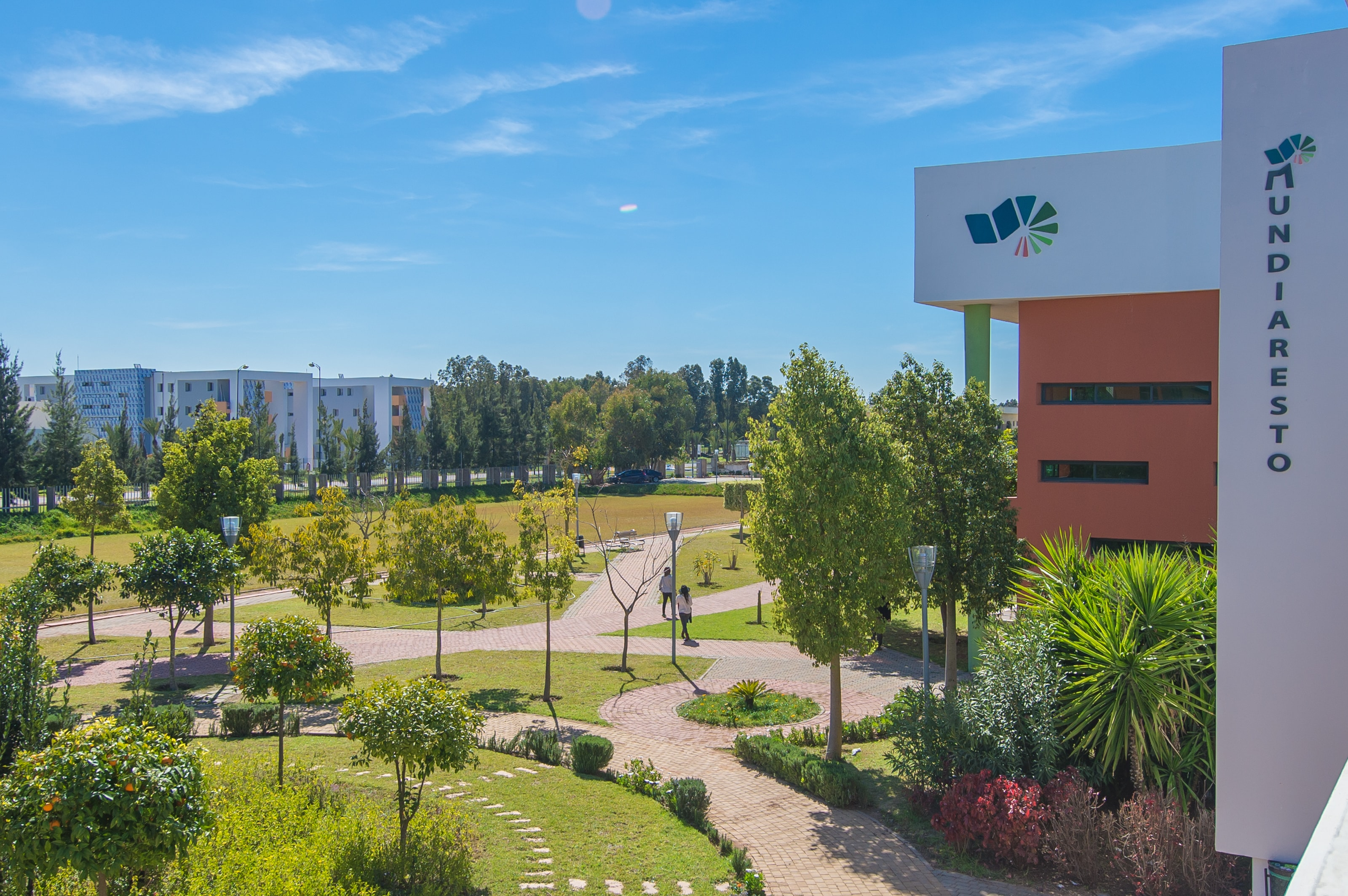
Université Mundiapolis

Public:

- École Centrale Casablanca
- University of Hassan II Casablanca

Private:

- HEM Business School
- Université Mundiapolis
- Université Internationale de Casablanca

=== Primary and secondary schools ===
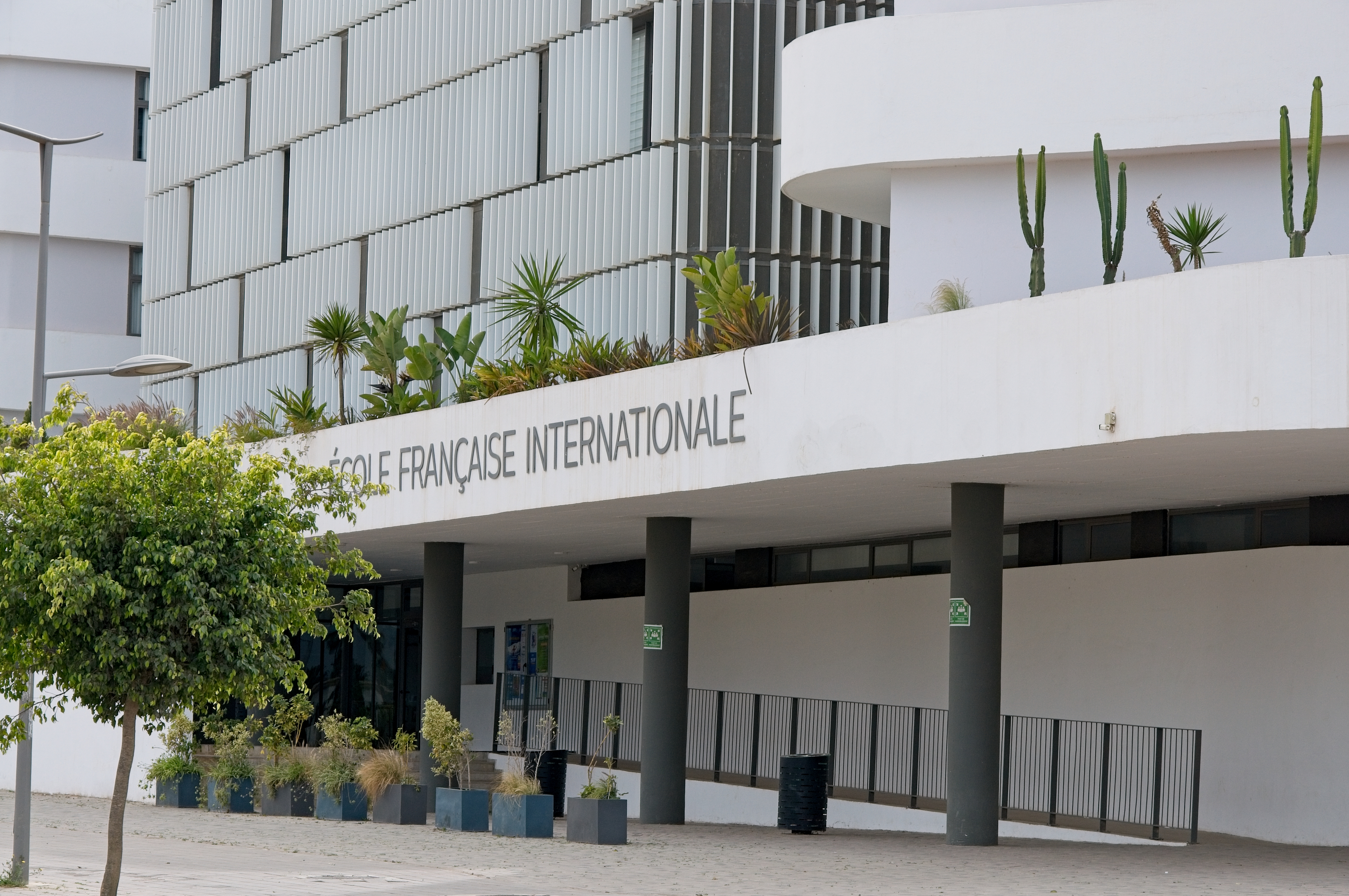
École française internationale de Casablanca

International:

- French:
  - Collège Anatole France
  - Lycée Lyautey
  - Groupe Scolaire Louis Massignon
  - Lycée La Résidence
  - Lycée Maïmonide
  - Lycée Léon l'Africain
  - École Normale Hébraïque
  - École Al Jabr
- Belgian: École Belge de Casablanca
- Italian: Scuola "Enrico Mattei"
- Spanish: Instituto Español Juan Ramón Jiménez
- American:
  - Casablanca American School
  - American Academy Casablanca
  - George Washington Academy
- British: École Montessori Casablanca

=== Libraries ===
- Hassan II Mosque Foundation Multimedia Library
- King Abdul Aziz Foundation for Human Sciences and Islamic Studies
- Dar America
- Institut Français
- Instituto Cervantes

== Places of worship ==
Casablanca Cathedral Sacré-Cœur

Most of the city's places of worship are Muslim mosques, of which the oldest in existence is the Dar al-Makhzen Mosque. There are also several zawiyas in the city dedicated to various ʾawliyāʾ (أولياء 'saints') and murābiṭs (مرابطين 'holy men'), the names of whom often begin with lāla (لالة 'lady'), as in Lala Taja, or sīdī (سيدي 'my lord'), as in Sidi Belyout, Sidi Abderrahman, etc. Some of the city's synagogues, such as Ettedgui Synagogue, also remain. Although most Christian churches are still in use, particularly by West African and European communities, some of those, built during the colonial period, have been repurposed as cultural spaces or converted into mosques since independence.

One of them was a former European church known as the Church of Saint Margaret, which was originally built as a Neo-Gothic styled church in Roches Noire by Eugène Lendrat, it was converted into al-Quds Mosque in 1981. Others, such as the Church of the Sacred Heart, and the Church of San Buenaventura, now serve as a cultural centers.

The Ould el-Hamra Mosque, along with the Ettedgui Synagogue and the Church of San Buenaventura, is considered to be one of three structures in the Medina that symbolize the three Abrahamic religions on a 250-square-meter area.

== Sport ==
"La Casablancaise" athletics track

=== Association football ===
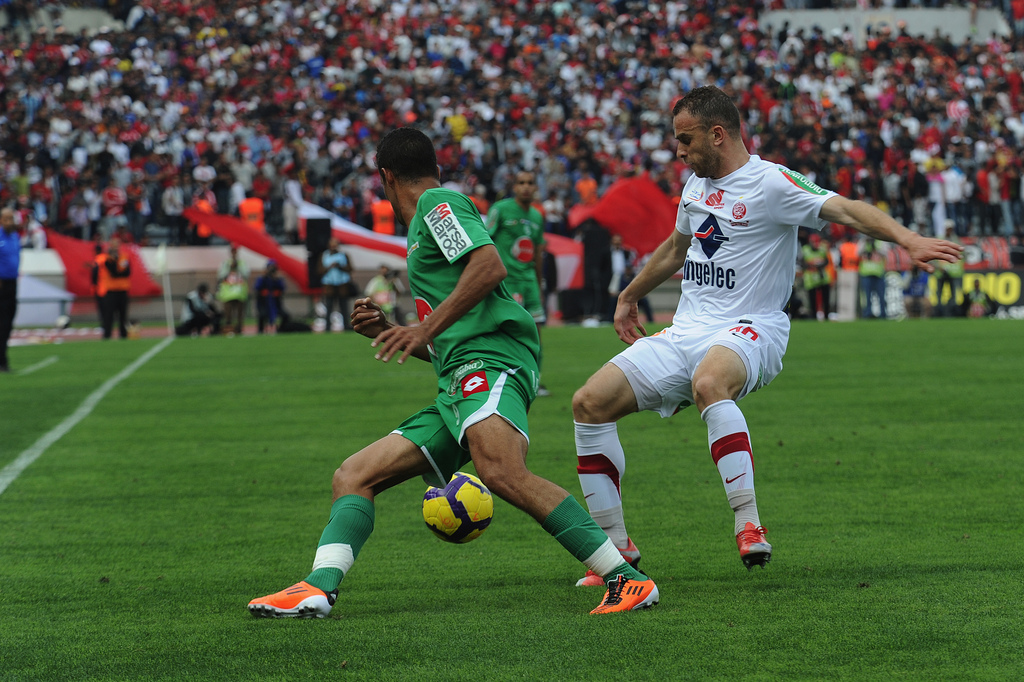
Players from Raja (left) and Wydad (right) during a Casablanca derby match in 2010

Casablanca is home to two popular football clubs: Wydad Casablanca and Raja Casablanca—which are rivals. Raja's symbol is an eagle and Wydad's symbol is a star and crescent, a symbol of Islam. These two popular clubs have produced some of Morocco's best players, such as: Salaheddine Bassir, Abdelmajid Dolmy, Baddou Zaki, Aziz Bouderbala, and Noureddine Naybet. Other football teams on top of these two major teams based in the city of Casablanca include Rachad Bernoussi, TAS de Casablanca, Majd Al Madina, and Racing Casablanca.

Raja CA, founded in 1949, competes in Botola and plays their home games at the Stade Mohammed V. The club, known for its supporters, is considered one of the most supported teams in Africa. Wydad AC, founded in 1937, also competes in Botola and plays its home games at the Stade Mohammed V. Both have a strong reputation in continental competitions, having both won the CAF Champions League three times.

Casablanca hosted eight African Champions League finals, all eight at the Stade Mohammed V. The Stade also hosted the 2018 CHAN Final (which Morocco won) and 1988 African Cup of Nations final. It could potentially host matches for the 2030 FIFA World Cup including the final.

=== Tennis ===
Casablanca hosts the Grand Prix Hassan II, a professional men's tennis tournament of the ATP tour.

=== Hosting ===
Casablanca staged the 1961 Pan Arab Games, the 1983 Mediterranean Games, and games during the 1988 Africa Cup of Nations. Morocco was scheduled to host the 2015 African Nations Cup, but decided to decline due to Ebola fears. Morocco hosted the 2025 Africa Cup of Nations.

=== Venues ===
- Stade Larbi Zaouli
- Stade Mohammed V
- Stade Sidi Bernoussi
- Complexe Al Amal de Casablanca

The Hassan II Stadium is the planned football stadium to be built in the city. Once completed in 2028, it will be used mostly for football matches and will serve as the home of Raja Casablanca, Wydad Casablanca, and the Morocco national football team. The stadium was designed with a capacity of 115,000 spectators, making it one of the highest-capacity stadiums in Africa. Once completed, it will replace the Stade Mohamed V. The initial idea of the stadium was for the 2010 FIFA World Cup, for which Morocco lost their bid to South Africa. Nevertheless, the Moroccan government supported the decision to go ahead with the plans. It will be completed in 2025. The idea of the stadium was also for the 2026 FIFA World Cup, for which Morocco lost their bid to Canada, Mexico, and United States. It will now host the 2030 FIFA World Cup, which Morocco will co-host with two European nations Spain and Portugal. It is expected to be complete by 2028.

=== Road racing ===
The city is host to the International Casablanca Marathon, a 26.2-mile road race that draws international competition. The race was founded in 2008 and is a member of the Association of International Marathons and Distance Races.

=== Motorsport ===
Casablanca hosted the first Formula One race in Africa, the 1958 Moroccan Grand Prix, on the long and challenging Ain-Diab street circuit; it remains the only championship-counting race held in the country to this day. At the time, the winner was the Englishman driver Stirling Moss, driving a Vanwall, in a race that was also marked by the fatal accident involving fellow Englishman Stuart Lewis-Evans on the 41st lap, in which he suffered severe burns after spinning out and colliding while driving another Vanwall (an incident that contributed to the ban on the Moroccan round of the Formula One World Championship).

== Culture ==
=== Music ===
Haja El Hamdaouia, one of the most iconic figures in aita music, was born in Casablanca. Nass El Ghiwane, led by Larbi Batma, came out of Hay Mohammadi in Casablanca. Naima Samih of Derb Sultan gained prominence through the program Mawahib (مواهب). Abdelhadi Belkhayat and Abdelwahab Doukkali are musicians specializing in traditional Moroccan Arabic popular music. Zina Daoudia, Abdelaziz Stati, Abdellah Daoudi, and Said Senhaji are notable Moroccan chaabi musicians.

Abdelakabir Faradjallah founded Attarazat Addahabia, a Moroccan funk band, in 1968. Fadoul, another funk band, formed in the 1970s. Hoba Hoba Spirit also formed in Casablanca, and is still based there. Casablanca has a thriving hiphop scene, with artists such as ElGrandeToto, Don Bigg, 7liwa, Dizzy DROS and Issam Harris. Casablanca hosts numerous music festivals, such as Jazzablanca and L'Boulevard, as well as a museum dedicated to Andalusi music, Dar ul-Aala.

=== Literature ===
Francesco Cavalli's L'Ormindo is a 17th-century Venetian opera set between Anfa and Fez. Driss Chraïbi's novel The Simple Past takes place in Casablanca. Mohamed Zafzaf lived in Maarif while writing and teaching at a high school. Lamalif, a radical leftist political and cultural magazine, was based in Casablanca.

Casablanca's International Book Fair is held at the fair grounds opposite Hassan II Mosque annually in February.

=== Theater ===
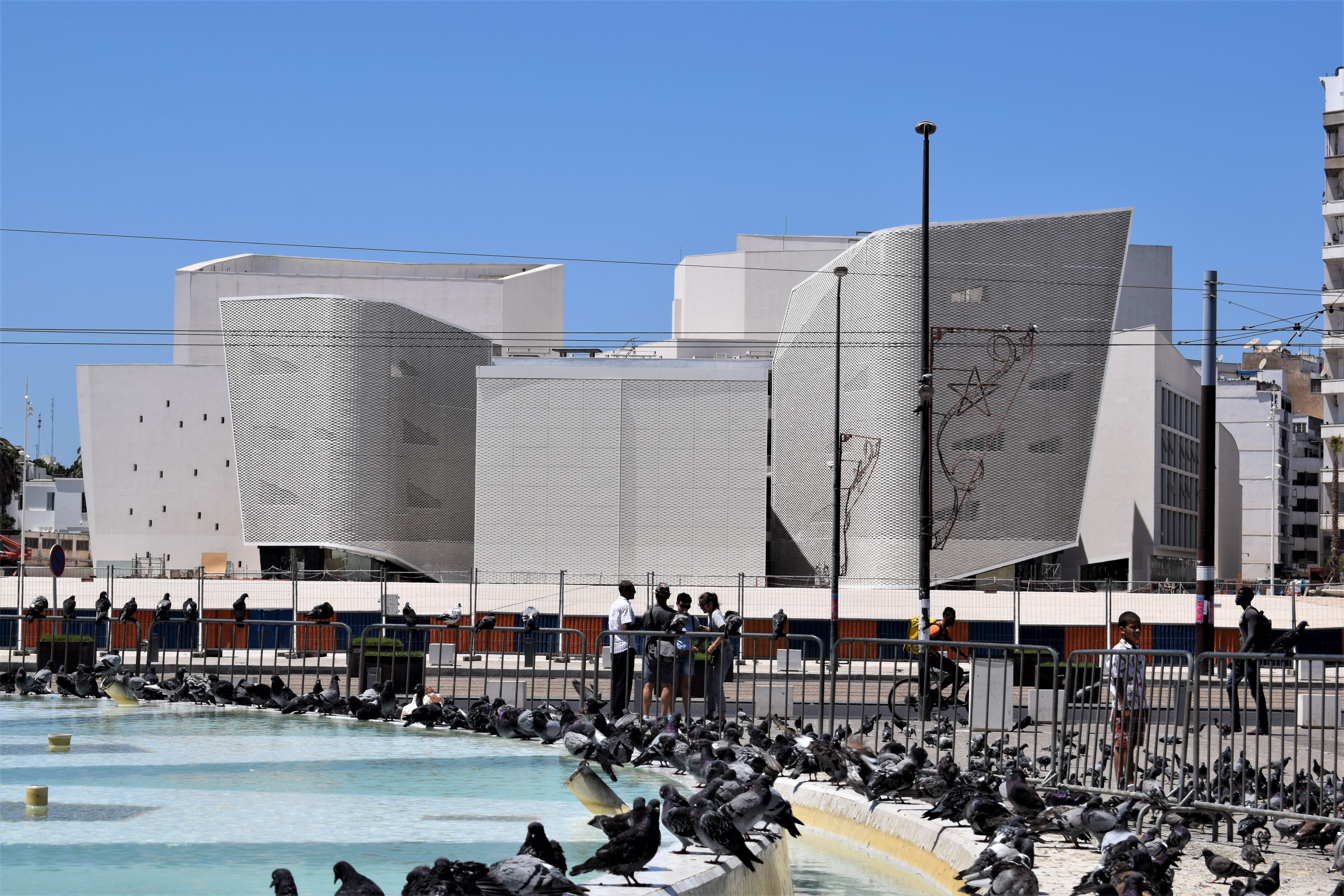
Casablanca Grand Theater

Tayeb Saddiki, described as the father of Moroccan theater, grew up in Casablanca and made his career there. Hanane el-Fadili and Hassan El Fad are popular comedians from Casablanca. Gad Elmaleh is another comedian from Casablanca, though he has made his career abroad.

=== Visual art ===
The École des Beaux-Arts of Casablanca was founded in 1919 by a French Orientalist painter named Édouard Brindeau de Jarny, who started his career teaching drawing at Lycée Lyautey. The Casablanca School—a Modernist art movement and collective including artists such as Farid Belkahia, Mohamed Melehi, and Mohammed Chabâa—developed out of the École des Beaux-Arts of Casablanca in the late 1960s.

The Academy of Traditional Arts, part of the Hassan II Mosque complex, was founded 31 October 2012. L'Uzine is a community-based art and culture space in Casablanca. Rebel Spirit published The Casablanca Guide (الدليل البيضاوي, Le Guide Casablancais) a comic book about life in Casablanca. Sbagha Bagha is a street art festival during which murals are created on the sides of apartment buildings.

=== Architecture ===
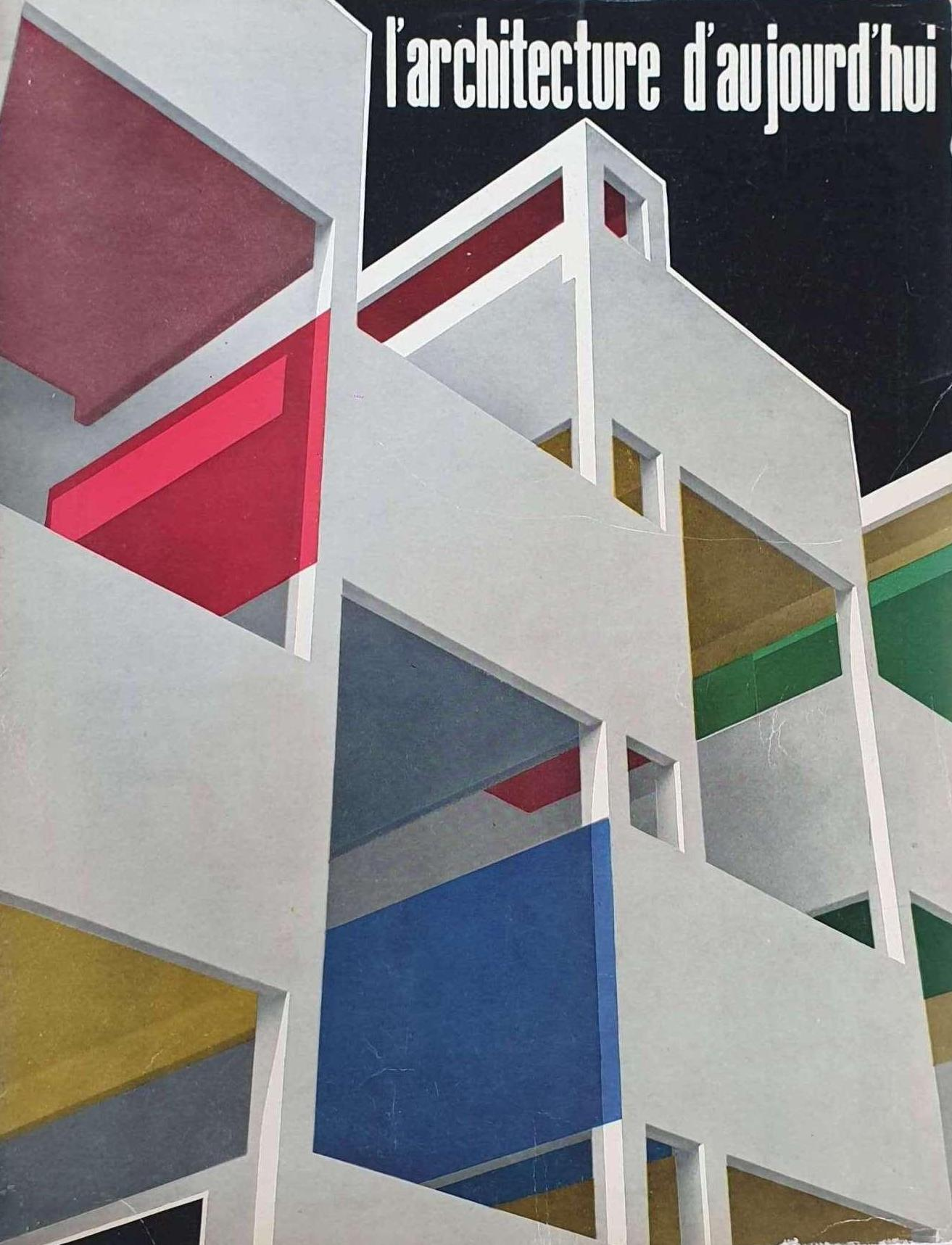
GAMMA's Nid D'Abeille of Carrières Centrales on the December 1954 cover of L'Architecture d'Aujourd'hui

Casablanca's architecture and urban development are historically significant. The city is home to many notable buildings in a variety of styles, including traditional Moroccan architecture, various colonial architectural styles, Art Nouveau, Art Deco, Neo-Mauresque, Streamline Moderne, Modernism, Brutalism, and more. During the French Protectorate, the French government described Casablanca as a "laboratory of urbanism".

The work of the Groupe des Architectes Modernes Marocains (GAMMA) on public housing projects—such as Carrières Centrales in Hay Mohammadi—in a style described as vernacular modernism influenced modernist architecture around the world.

Casamémoire and MAMMA. are two organizations dedicated to the preservation and appreciation of the city's architectural heritage.

=== Photography ===
Postcard companies such as Léon & Lévy were active in Casablanca. Gabriel Veyre also worked and eventually died in Casablanca.

Marcelin Flandrin (1889–1957), a French military photographer, settled in Casablanca and recorded much of the early colonial period in Morocco with his photography. With his staged nude postcard photos taken in Casablanca's colonial brothel quarter, Flandrin was also responsible for disseminating the orientalist image of Moroccan women as sexual objects.

Casablanca has a thriving street photography scene. Yoriyas is prominent among photographers capturing the economic capital's street scenes, and has attracted international attention.

=== Film ===
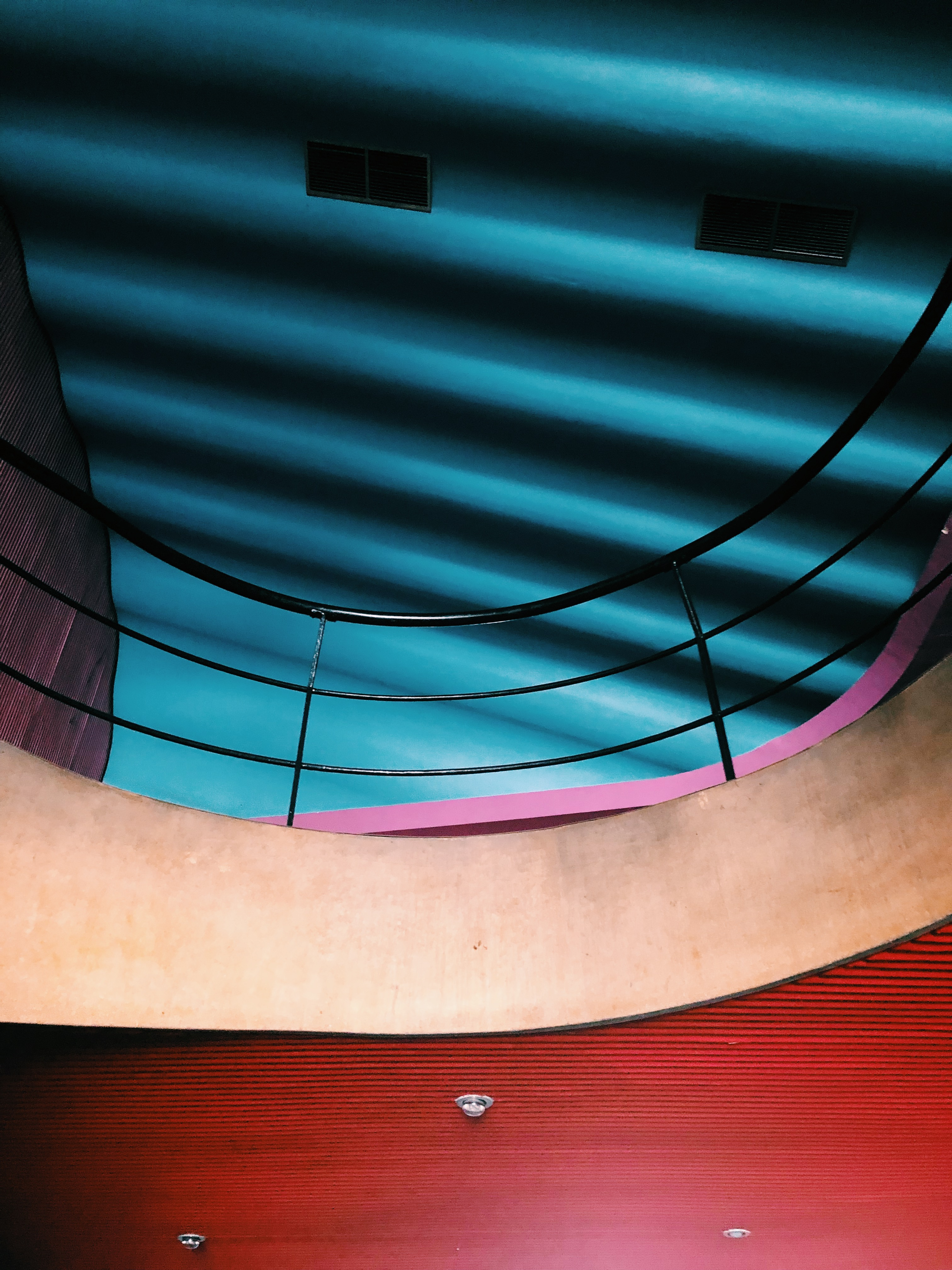
Ceiling and mezzanine of Cinema Lynx in Mers Sultan

In the first half of the 20th century, Casablanca had many movie theaters, such as Cinema Rialto, Cinema Lynx and Cinema Vox, the largest in Africa when it was built.

The 1942 American film Casablanca is set in Casablanca and has had a lasting impact on the city's image although it was filmed in the United States. Rick's Café Casablanca, which opened in 2004, was inspired by the film.

Salut Casa! was a propaganda film brandishing France's purported colonial triumph in its mission civilisatrice in the city.

Mostafa Derkaoui's revolutionary independent film About Some Meaningless Events (1974) took place in Casablanca. It was the main subject of Ali Essafi's documentary Before the Dying of the Light.

Love in Casablanca (1991), starring Abdelkarim Derqaoui and Muna Fettou, is one of the first Moroccan films to deal with Morocco's complex realities and to depict life in Casablanca with verisimilitude. Nour-Eddine Lakhmari's Casanegra (2008) depicts the harsh realities of Casablanca's working classes. The films Ali Zaoua (2000), Horses of God (2012), and Razzia (2017) of Nabil Ayouch, a French director of Moroccan heritage, deal with street crime, terrorism and social issues in Casablanca, respectively. The events in Meryem Benm'Barek-Aloïsi's 2018 film Sofia revolve around an illegitimate pregnancy in Casablanca. Ahmed El Maanouni, Hicham Lasri and Said Naciri are also from Casablanca.

== Transport ==
Mohammed V International Airport

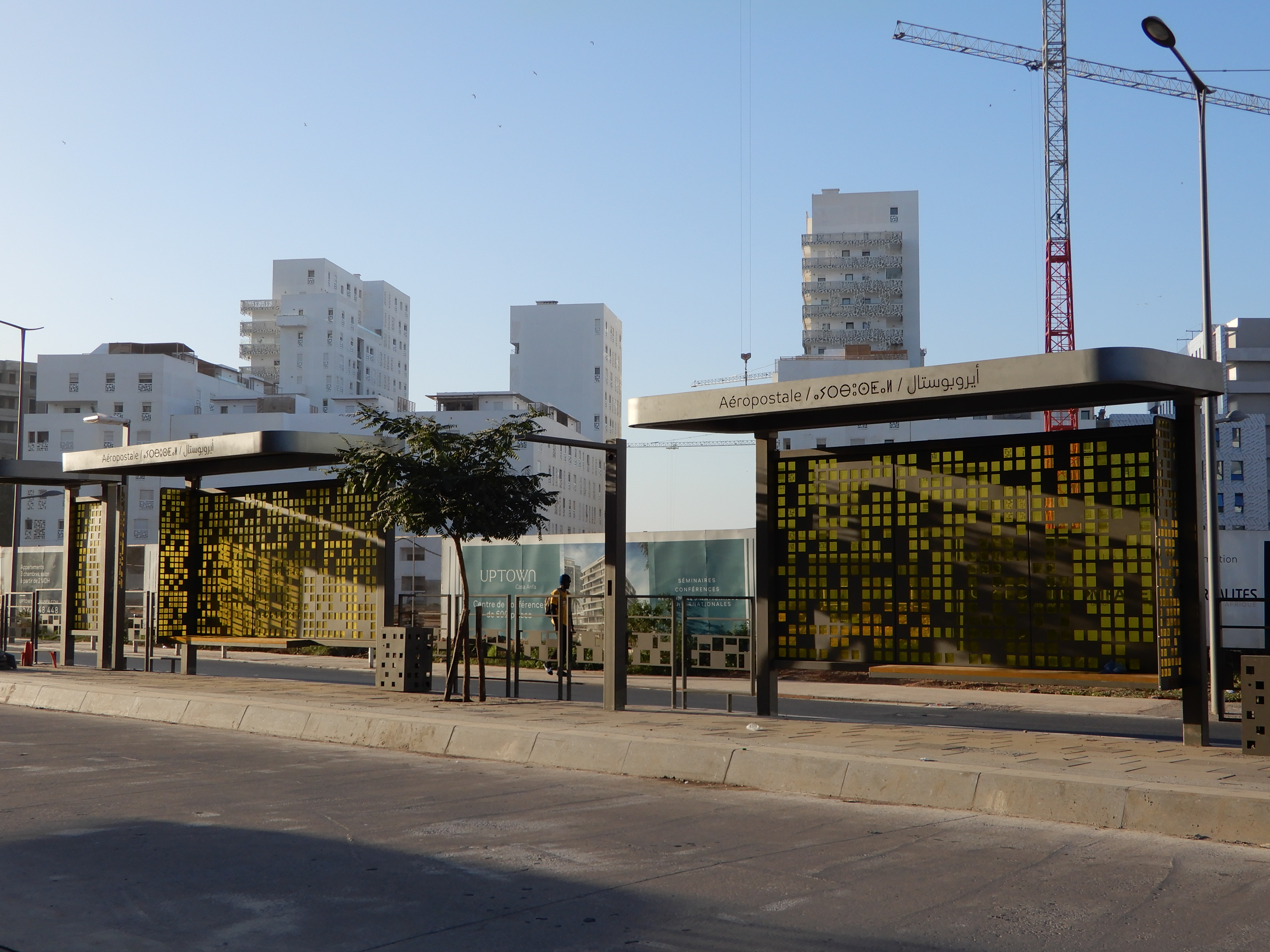
Casablanca Busway

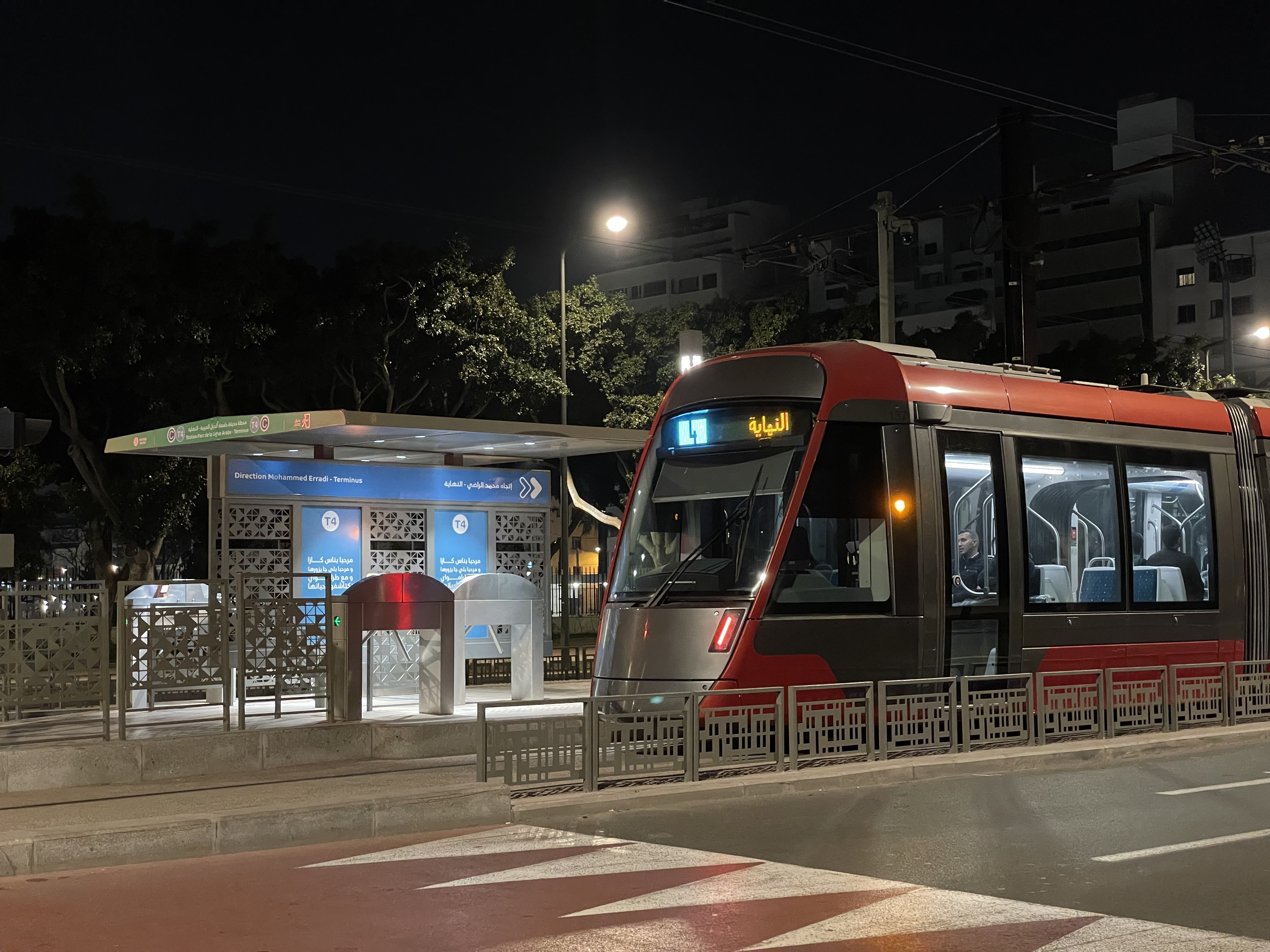
Casablanca Tramway

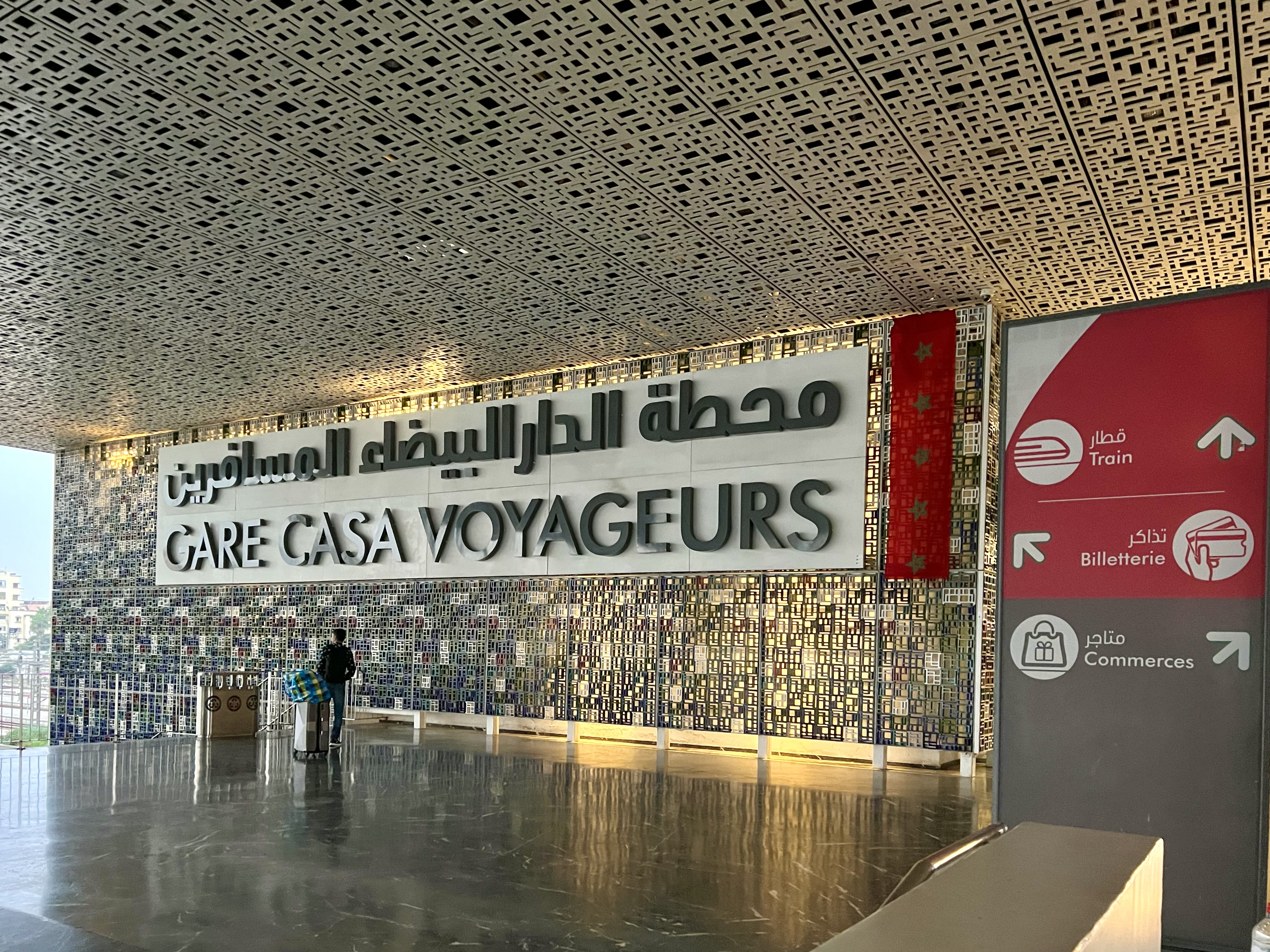
Casa-Voyageurs Railway Station

=== Air ===
Casablanca is primarily served by Mohammed V International Airport.

=== Rapid transit ===
The Casablanca Tramway is the rapid transit tram system in Casablanca. As of 2024, the network consists of four lines covering 74 km (46 mi), with 110 stops.

Casablanca has also implemented a rapid bus transit system known as the Casablanca Busway, a high-level bus network serving the city. As of 2024, the network consists of two lines, BW1 and BW2.

Since the 1970s, Casablanca has planned to build a metro system to offer some relief to the problems of traffic congestion and poor air quality. However, the city council voted to abandon the metro project in 2014 due to high costs, and decided to continue expanding the already operating tram system instead.

Compagnie de Transports au Maroc (CTM) offers private intercity coach buses on various lines run servicing most notable Moroccan towns, as well as some European cities. These run from the CTM Bus Station on Leo Africanus Street near the Central Market in downtown Casablanca. Supratours, an affiliate of ONCF, also offers coach bus service at a slightly lower cost, departing from a station on Wilad Zian Street. There is another bus station farther down on the same street called the Wilad Zian Bus Station; this station is the country's largest bus station, serving over 800 buses daily, catering more to Morocco's lower income population.

The National office of railway transport (ONCF) is currently developing a Regional Express Network (RER) for the Casablanca metropolitan area, aimed at expanding urban and peri-urban mobility ahead of the 2030 FIFA World Cup. Planned as a three-line network totaling 92 kilometers and featuring 18 stations, the RER will connect central Casablanca with Mohammedia, Benslimane Province, and Nouaceur. The network is designed to link strategic infrastructure across the region, including Mohammed V International Airport and the upcoming Hassan II Stadium, with trains operating at frequencies of up to every 15 minutes on key sections. the station infrastructure development is split into two main bidding packages worth a combined 400 million MAD (~US$40 million) with an 18-month completion timeline. The first lot covers northern and industrial sectors (including Mohammedia Facultés, Zenata Industrielle, Sidi Bernoussi, and Aïn Sebaâ), while the second covers central and southern corridors (including Hay Mohammadi, Mers Sultan, Casa Oasis, Sidi Maârouf, and Nouaceur Nouvelle Ville). By 2030, the system is projected to carry up to 180,000 daily passengers, significantly easing road congestion across Grand Casablanca.

== Tourism ==
Although Mohammed V International Airport receives most international flights into Morocco, international tourism in Casablanca is not as developed as it is in cities such as Fez and Marrakesh.

The Hassan II Mosque, which is the second-largest mosque in Africa and the seventh-largest in the world, is the city's main tourist attraction. Visitors also come to see the city's rich architectural heritage.

Popular sites for national tourism include shopping centres such as Morocco Mall, Anfa Place, the Marina Shopping Centre, and the Tachfine Centre. Additional sites include the Corniche and the beach of Ain Diab, and parks such as the Arab League Park or the Sindibad theme park.

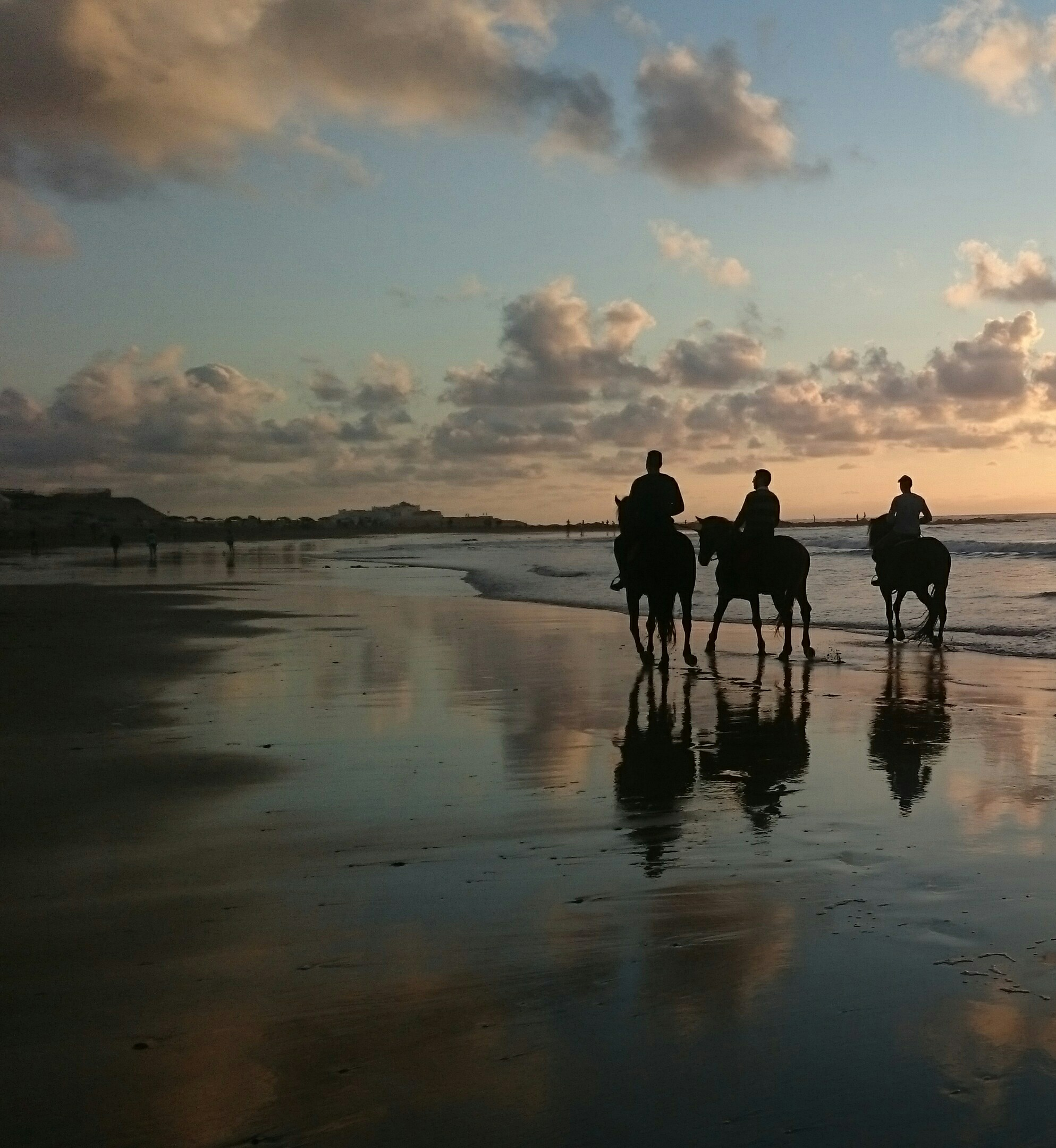
Sunset at Ain Diab

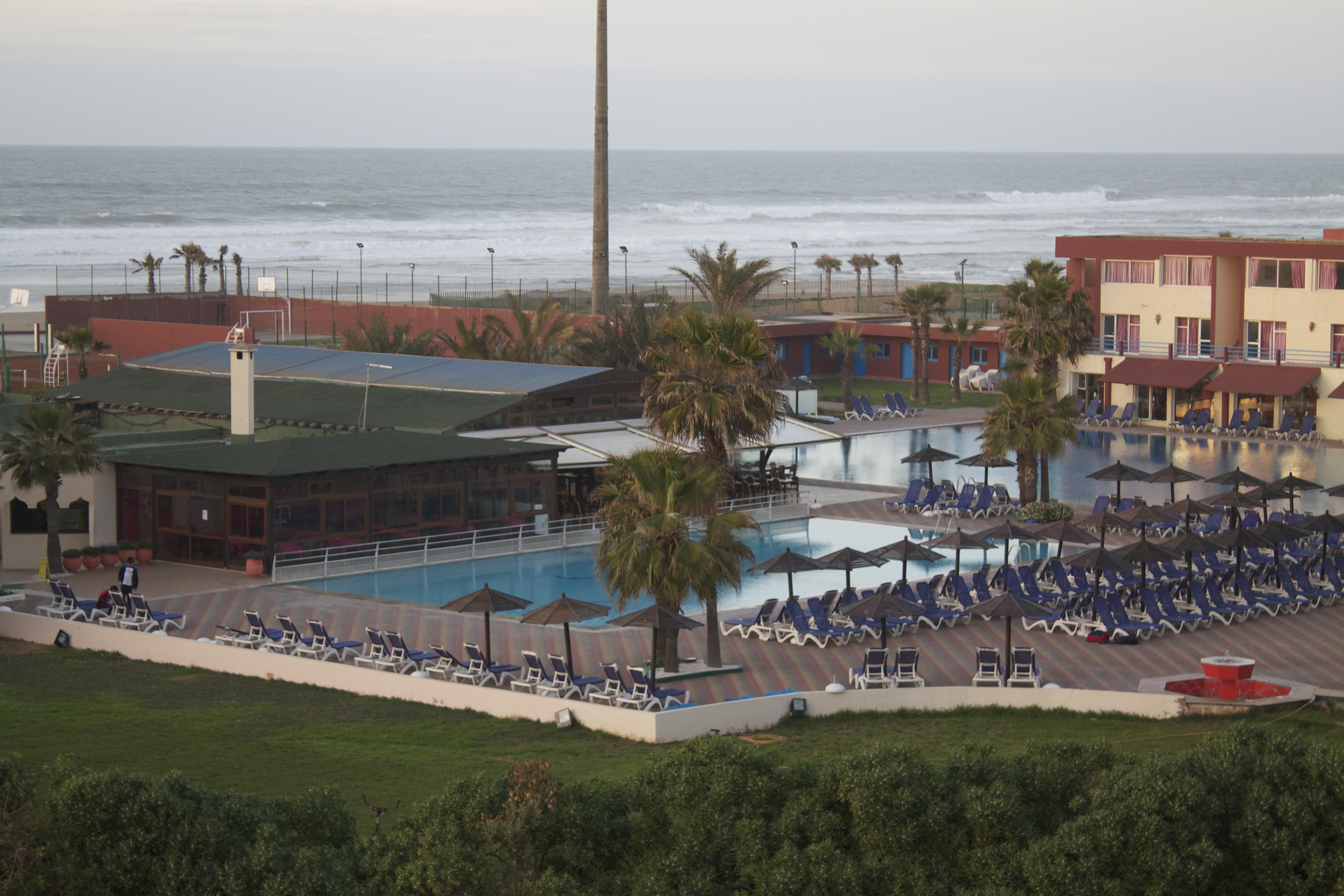
Casablanca Beach

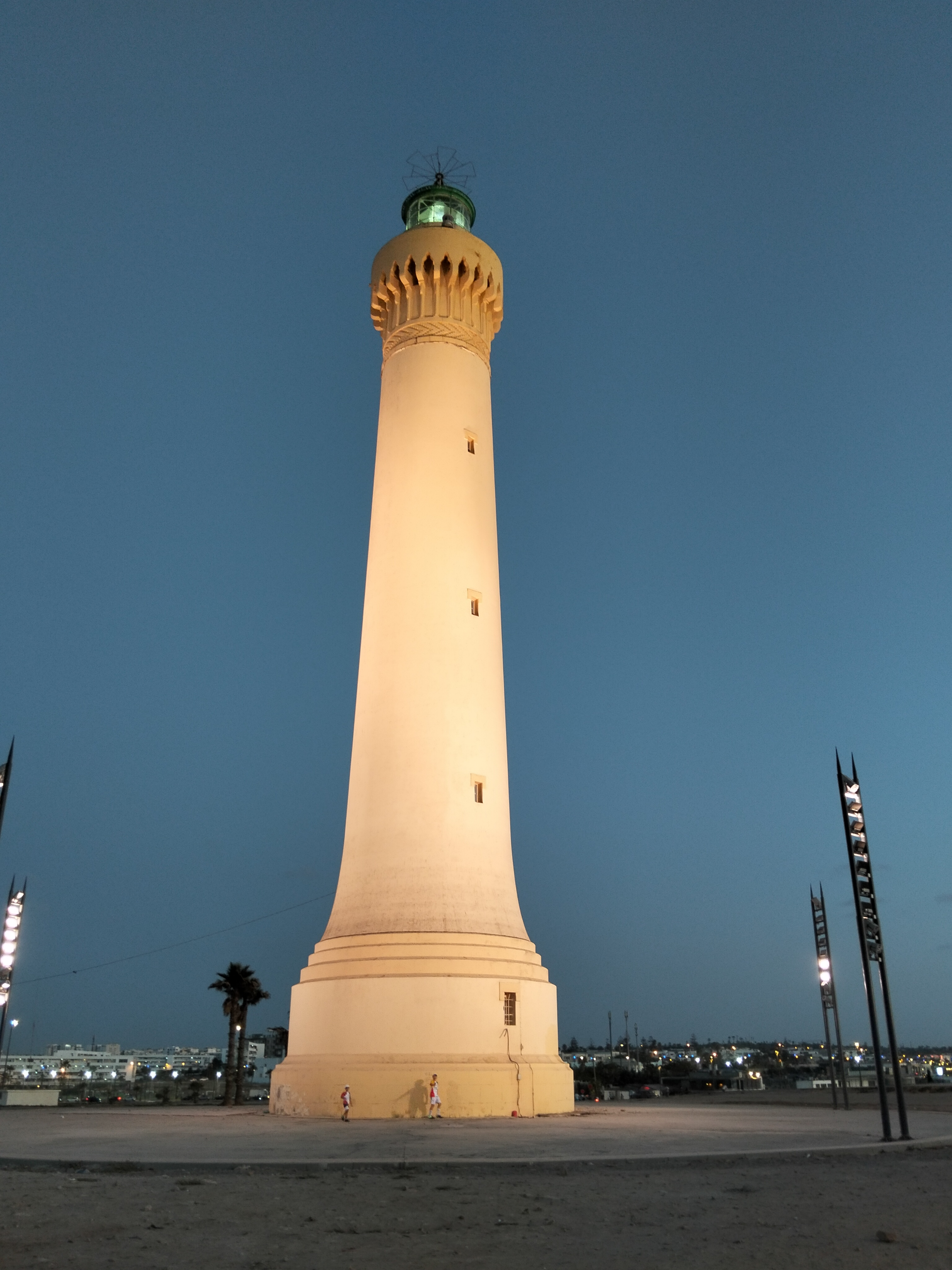
El Hank Lighthouse

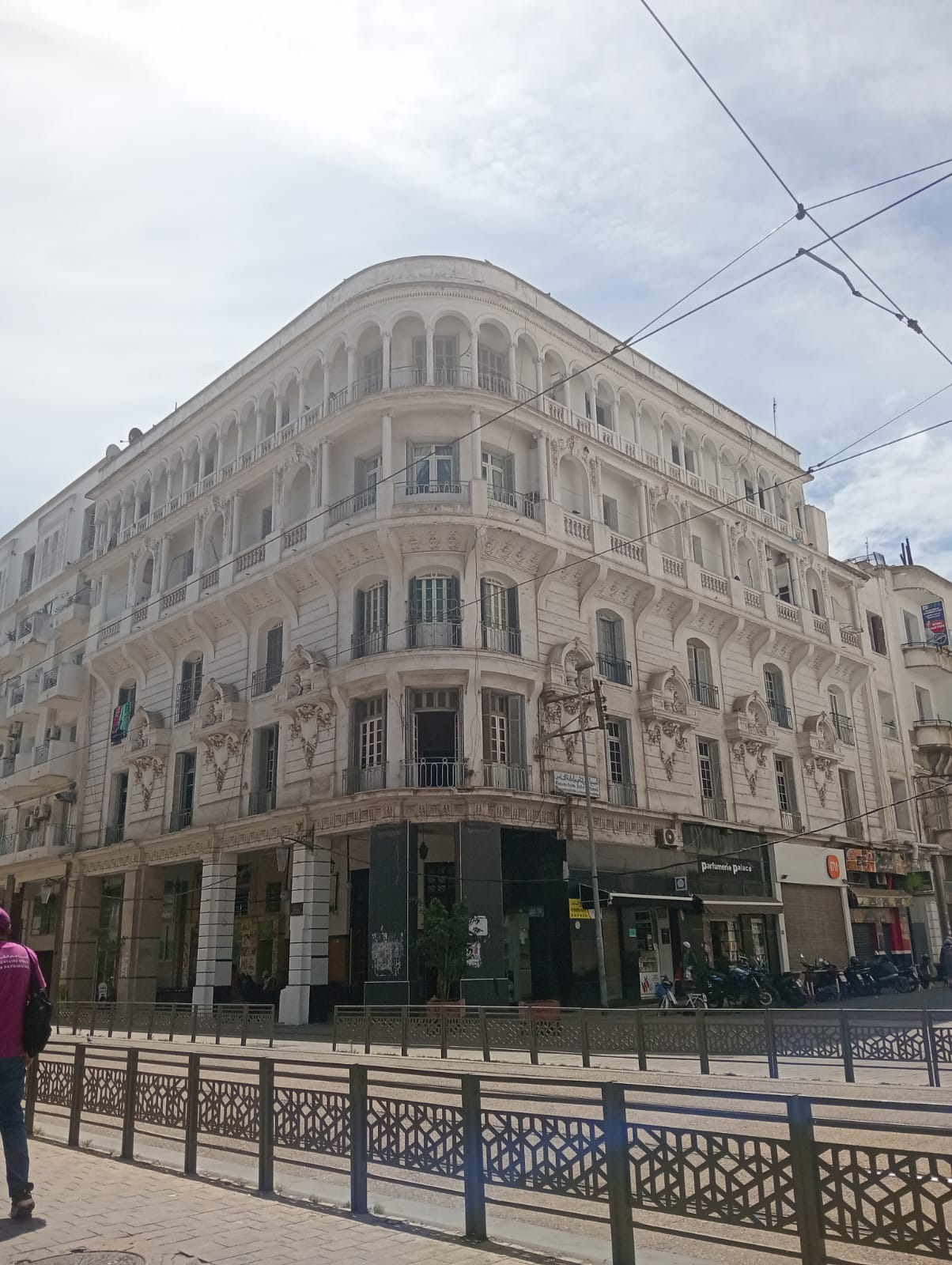
Colonial architecture

Hassan II Mosque

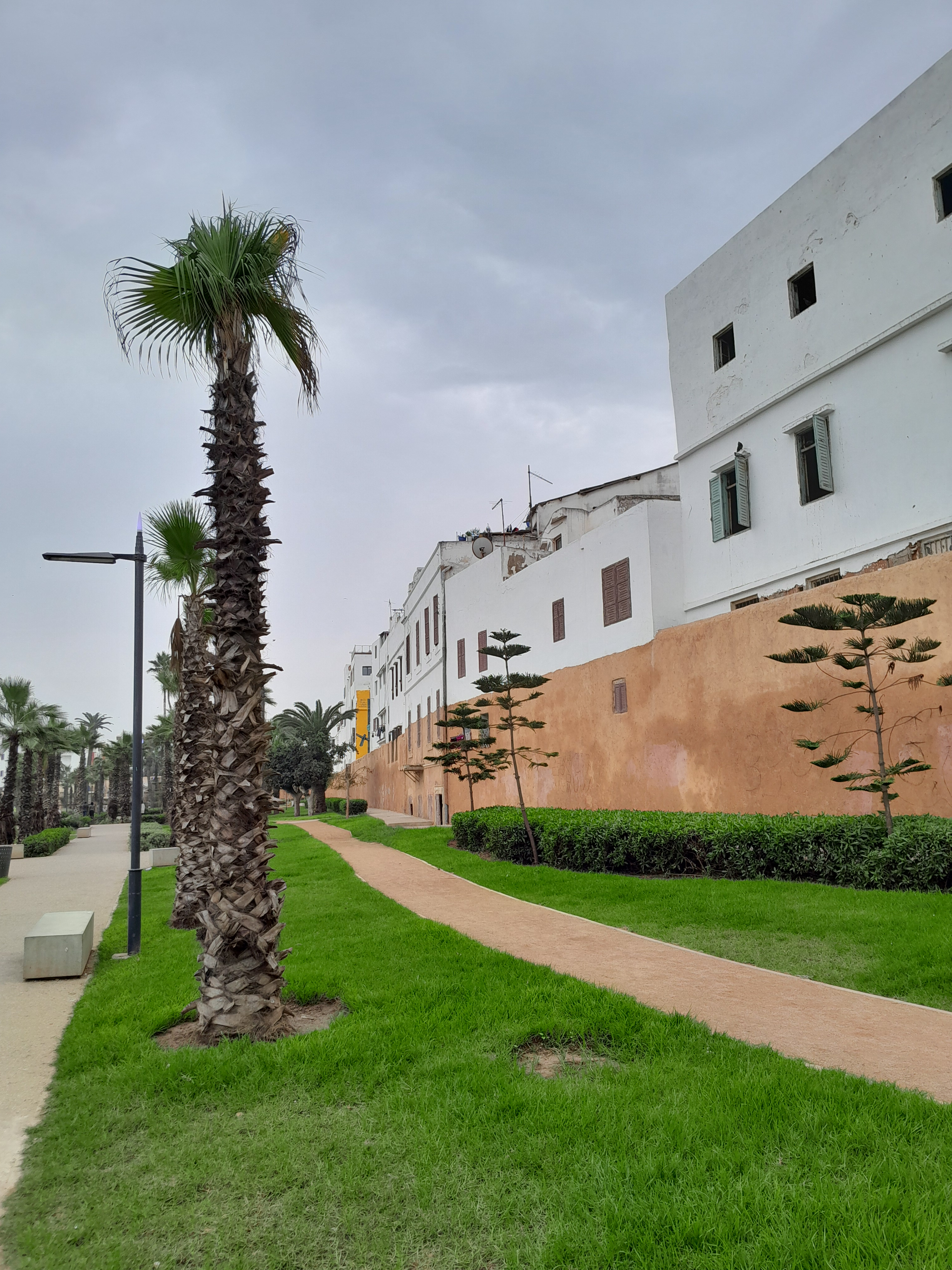
the Medina of Casablanca

== Notable people ==
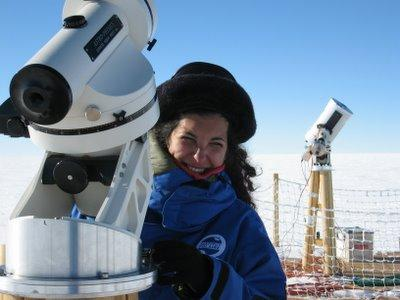
Merieme Chadid led an international scientific program to install a major astronomical observatory in Antarctica.

- Lahcen Abrami – former Moroccan footballer
- Saida el Alami – Moroccan human rights activist
- Amine Atouchi – Moroccan footballer
- Amal Ayouch – Moroccan stage and film actress
- Khalil Azmi – former Moroccan goalkeeper
- Wissam Baraka – Moroccan footballer
- Salaheddine Bassir – Moroccan footballer
- Laarbi Batma – Moroccan musician and artist, founding member of Nas El Ghiwan
- Larbi Benbarek – Moroccan footballer
- Badr Benoun – Moroccan footballer
- Miriem Bensalah-Chaqroun – Moroccan businesswoman
- Jean-Paul Bertrand-Demanes – French footballer
- Frida Boccara – French singer, winner of the Eurovision Song Contest 1969
- Aziz Bouderbala – former Moroccan footballer
- Merieme Chadid – Moroccan astronomer
- Mustapha Chadili – former goalkeeper
- Achraf Dari – Moroccan footballer
- Jean-Charles de Castelbajac – Moroccan/French fashion designer
- Nabil Dirar – Moroccan footballer
- Abdelmajid Dolmy – former Moroccan footballer
- Don Bigg – Moroccan rapper and songwriter
- Dizzy DROS – Moroccan rapper and producer
- Issam El Adoua – Moroccan footballer
- Badr El Kaddouri – former Moroccan footballer
- Talal El Karkouri – former Moroccan footballer
- Gad Elmaleh – French/Canadian/Moroccan comedian
- Bouchaib El Moubarki – former Moroccan footballer
- Youssef Fertout – Moroccan manager
- La Fouine – Moroccan/French rapper
- Khalid Fouhami – former Moroccan goalkeeper
- Mohamed Fouzair – Moroccan footballer
- Divina Frau-Meigs – Moroccan sociologist and professor
- El Haqed – Moroccan rapper
- Serge Haroche – French physicist, awarded the 2012 Nobel Prize for Physics
- Shatha Hassoun – Moroccan/Iraqi singer and actress
- Lydia Hatuel-Czuckermann – Israeli Olympic fencer
- Mouhcine Iajour – Moroccan footballer
- Driss Joumad – former Morocco international footballer
- Nadir Lamyaghri – former Moroccan goalkeeper
- Michel Lapidus – Moroccan-born French-American mathematician
- Hamza Mendyl – Moroccan footballer
- Hicham Mesbahi – Moroccan boxer
- French Montana – Moroccan/American rapper
- Nawal El Moutawakel – Moroccan Olympic champion
- Hakim Mouzaki – Moroccan footballer
- Abderrahim Najah – Moroccan international basketball player
- Noureddine Naybet – Moroccan footballer
- Mostafa Nissaboury – Moroccan poet
- Hakim Noury – Moroccan film director
- Maurice Ohana – French composer
- Faouzia Ouihya – Moroccan-Canadian singer
- Azzedine Ounahi – Moroccan footballer
- Jean Reno – French-spanish actor
- Youssef Rossi – former Moroccan footballer
- Abdelilah Saber – Moroccan former footballer
- Youssef Safri – Moroccan football manager
- Jamal Sellami – Moroccan football manager
- Daniel Sivan – Israeli professor
- Alain Souchon – French songwriter
- Frank Stephenson – Moroccan/British/American award-winning automobile designer
- Hassan Saada – Moroccan boxer
- Tagne – rapper
- Sidney Taurel – naturalized American CEO of Eli Lilly and Company from 1998 to 2008
- Richard Virenque – French cyclist
- Muhammad Zarqtuni – Moroccan nationalist and resistance leader
- Abdallah Zrika – Moroccan poet

== Twin towns – sister cities ==
Casablanca is twinned with:

- Bordeaux, France
- Busan, South Korea
- Chicago, United States
- Dakar, Senegal
- Dubai, United Arab Emirates
- Jakarta, Indonesia
- Kuala Lumpur, Malaysia
- Muscat, Oman
- Nouadhibou, Mauritania
- Shanghai, China

Casablanca also has cooperation agreements with:

- Abuja, Nigeria
- Amman, Jordan
- Amsterdam, Netherlands
- Barcelona, Spain
- Buenos Aires, Argentina
- Hebron, Palestine
- Istanbul, Turkey
- Kajiado, Kenya
- Koudougou, Burkina Faso
- Montreal, Canada
- Moroni, Comoros
- Nouakchott, Mauritania
- Paris, France
- Ramallah, Palestine
- Rotterdam, Netherlands
- Brussels, Belgium
- Madrid, Spain
- London, United Kingdom
- San Sebastián, Spain
- Bucharest, Romania
- Prague, Czech Republic

== See also ==
- Royal Palace of Casablanca
- History of Casablanca
- Casablanca-Settat
- Sarkel – Ruined fortress in Russia
