= History of Casablanca =

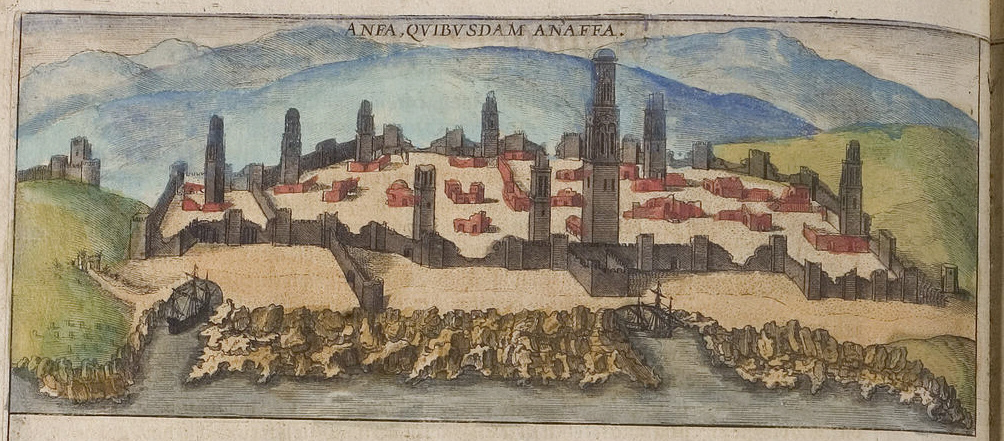
Casablanca in 1572, when it was still called Anfa

The history of the city of Casablanca in Morocco has been one of many political and cultural changes. At different times it has been governed by Berber, Roman, Arab, Portuguese, Spanish, French, British, and Moroccan regimes. It has had an important position in the region as a port city, making it valuable to a series of conquerors during its early history.

The original Berber name, Anfa (meaning: "hill" in English), was used by the locals until the earthquake of 1755 destroyed the city. When Sultan Mohammed ben Abdallah rebuilt the city's medina, he gave it the name "ad-Dār al-Bayḍāʾ" (الدار البيضاء) a literal translation of Casablanca into Arabic. French forces occupied the city in 1907 and adopted the Spanish name, Casablanca. The name Anfa now refers to an area within Casablanca, slightly West of the 18th century medina.

== Roman Anfa ==
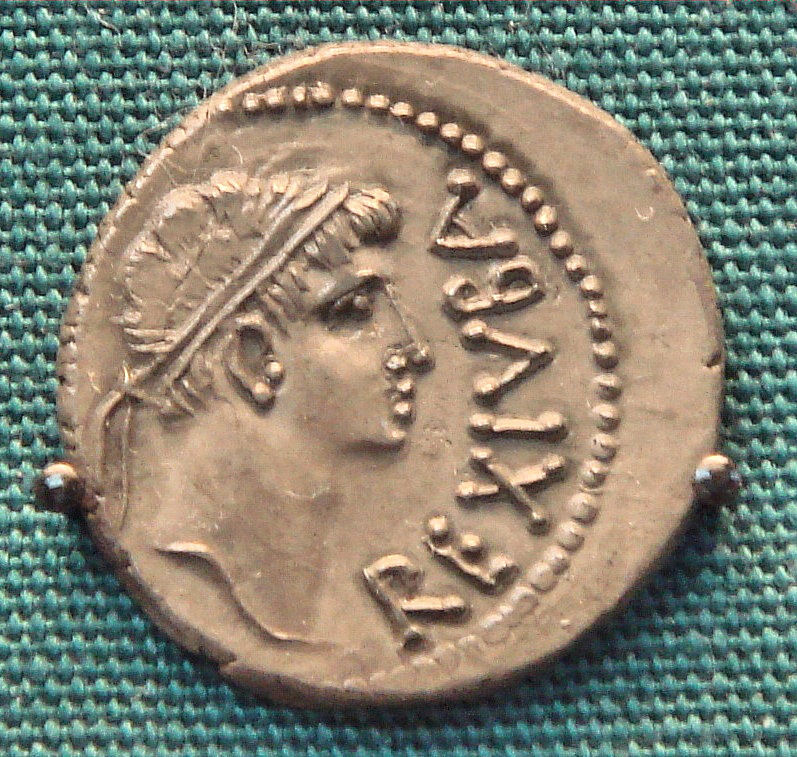
Roman coin of Juba II similar to those found in a wreckage inside Roman Anfa port

Anfa is a big city, built by the Romans on the ocean shore... —Leo Africanus

Leo Africanus defined Anfa as a city built by the Romans in his famous Descrittione dell'Africa (Description of Africa), written in the 16th century.

The area which is today Casablanca was founded and settled by the Berbers by about the 10th century BC. It was used as a port by the Phoenicians and later by the Romans.

Romans occupied the area in 15 BC and created the important commercial port known later as Anfa, directly connected to the Mogador island in the Iles Purpuraires of southern Mauritania. From there they obtained a special dye, that colored the purple stripe in Imperial Roman Senatorial togas. The expedition of Juba II to discover the Canary Islands and Madeira probably departed from Anfa.

The Roman port, probably called initially Anfus in the Latin language, was part of a Berber client state of Rome until Emperor Augustus. When Rome annexed Ptolemy of Mauretania's kingdom, Anfa was incorporated into the Roman Empire by Caligula. But this was done only nominally because the Roman limes was a few dozen kilometers north of the port (the Roman military fortifications of Mauretania Tingitana were just a few kilometers south of the Roman colonia named Sala Colonia). However, Roman Anfa—connected mainly by commerce and by socio-cultural ties to Volubilis ("autonomous" from Rome since 285 AD)—lasted until the 5th century, when Vandals conquered Roman northwestern Africa.

A Roman wreck of the 2nd century, from which were salvaged 169 silver coins, shows that the Romans appreciated this useful port for commerce. There is even evidence of oil commerce with Roman Volubilis and Tingis in the 3rd century. Probably there was a small community of Christians (linked to Roman merchants) in the port city until the fifth/sixth century.

== Barghawata ==
A large Berber tribe, the Barghawata, settled in the area between the rivers Bou Regreg to the north and Oum er-Rbia to the south. It established itself as an independent Berber kingdom in Tamasna around in 744 AD following the Berber Revolt against the Umayyad Caliph Hisham ibn Abd al-Malik. It remained until it was conquered by the Almoravids in 1068 AD.

Abou El Kassem El Ziani refers to ancient Casablanca as "Anfa" and stated that the Zenatiyins (Berber dynasty under Arab rule) were the first people that established Anfa in the period of their settlement in Tamassna.

The Almohad Sultan Abd al-Mu'min drove the Barghawata out of Tamasna in 1149, and replaced them with Bedouin Arab tribes, notably Banu Hilal and Banu Sulaym.

== Early modern period ==
Animation modeling the tsunamis caused by the earthquake of 1755, which destroyed the settlement at Anfa

During the 14th century, under the Zenata Merinid Dynasty, the town rose in importance as a port and in the early 15th century, became independent once again. It emerged as a safe harbor for Barbary pirates. In 1468, the city was captured and destroyed by the Kingdom of Portugal and the Algarves under Rei Afonso V the African. The Portuguese used the ruins to build a military fortress in 1515. The village that grew up around it was called "Casa Branca", meaning "White House" in Portuguese.

After the death of Rei Sebastian in the decisive Portuguese defeat at the hands of the Saadi Empire in the Battle of Alcácer Quibir and the ensuing crisis of succession, Portugal and with it Casablanca became part of the Iberian Union from 1580 to 1640. With the secession of Portugal in 1640, Casablanca again became a Portuguese outpost until 1755 AD, when it was destroyed by an earthquake and the Portuguese abandoned it.

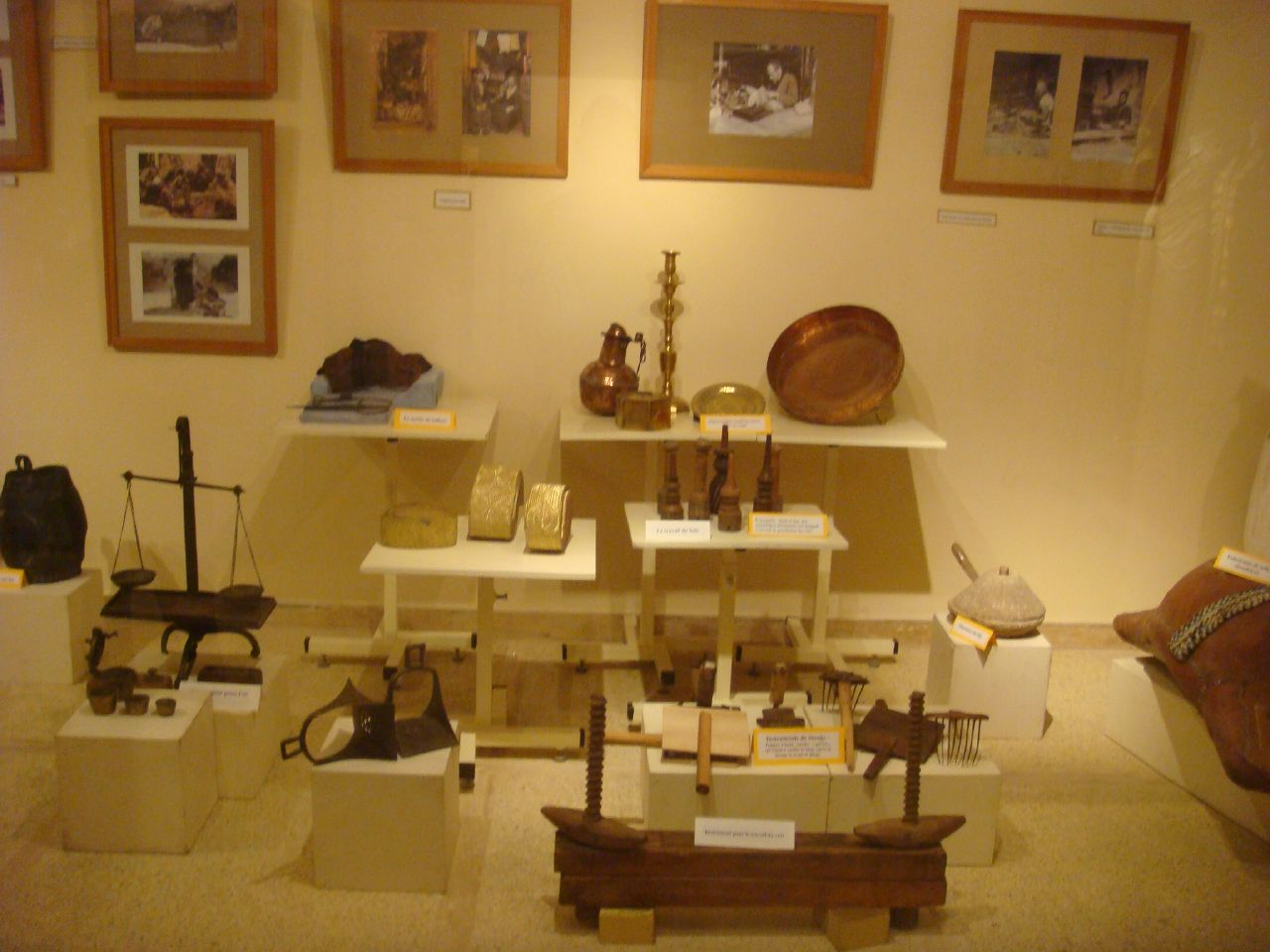
Artifacts in the Jewish Museum of Casablanca.

The Medina of Casablanca as was founded in 1770 AD by Sultan Muhammad III ben Abdallah (1756–1790), the grandson of Ismail Ibn Sharif. Built with the aid of Spaniards, the town was called Casa Blanca (white house in Spanish), translated to Dar el Beida in Arabic.

== 19th century ==
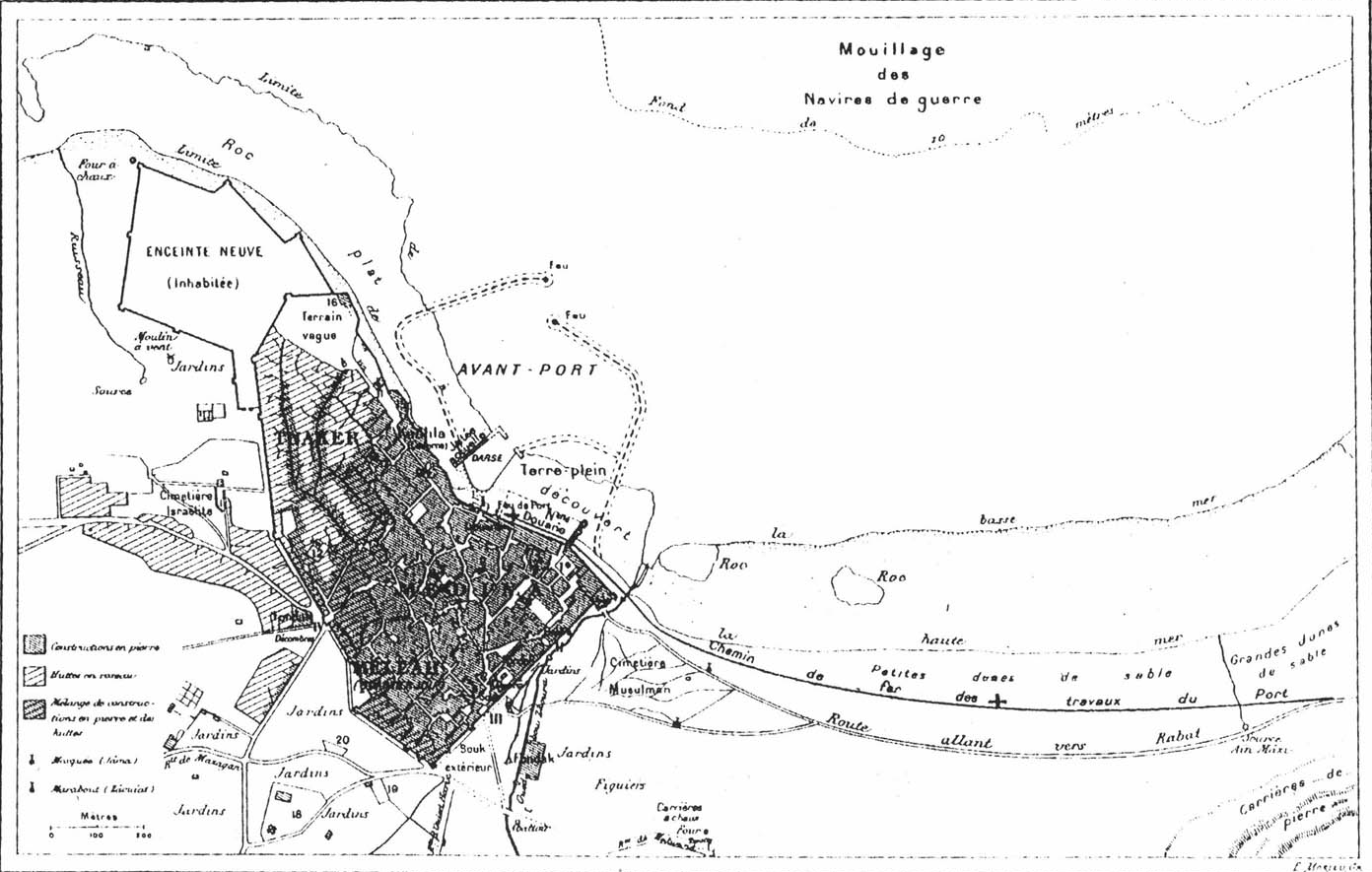
Plan of Casablanca in 1907, the year the French bombed the city, prepared by the French doctor Frédéric Weisgerber and published in L'Illustration, 10 August 1907.

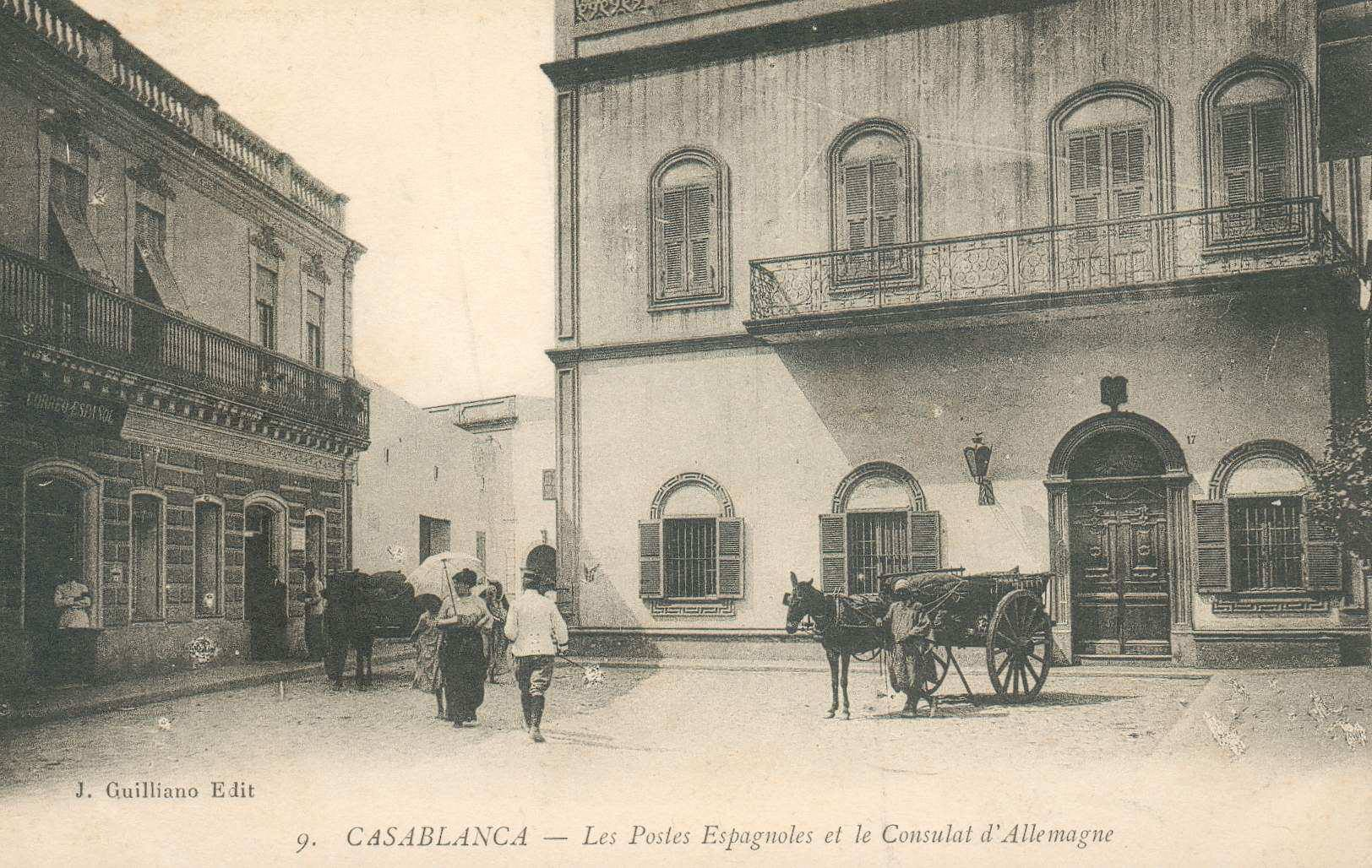
The first German consulate in Morocco was in Casablanca.

In the 19th century Casablanca became a major supplier of wool to the booming textile industry in Britain and shipping traffic increased (the British, in return, began importing Morocco's now famous national drink, gunpowder tea). By the 1860s, there were around 5,000 residents, and the population grew to around 10,000 by the late 1880s. Casablanca grew due to the protégé system, through which Moroccans protected by European powers became independent of the Makhzen. Casablanca was also one of the main Atlantic ports to receive Jewish migrants from the Moroccan hinterlands following the mission of Moses Montefiore to Morocco in 1864.

Casablanca remained a modestly sized port, with a population reaching around 12,000 within a few years of the French conquest and arrival of French colonialists in the town, at first administrators within a sovereign sultanate, in 1906. By 1921, this was to rise to 110,000, largely through the development of bidonvilles.

"Whereas Casablanca appears somewhat forbidding and hostile from the sea, it could not present a more welcoming picture to those traveling from inland. Its leafy gardens are topped by willowy palm trees, crenelated walls, flat roofs, and whitewashed minarets dazzling in the African sun; all this offers a striking backdrop against the deep blue of the natural haven that cradles svelte yachts and burly black and red steamboats." - F. Weisgerber

== French rule ==
=== French Invasion ===
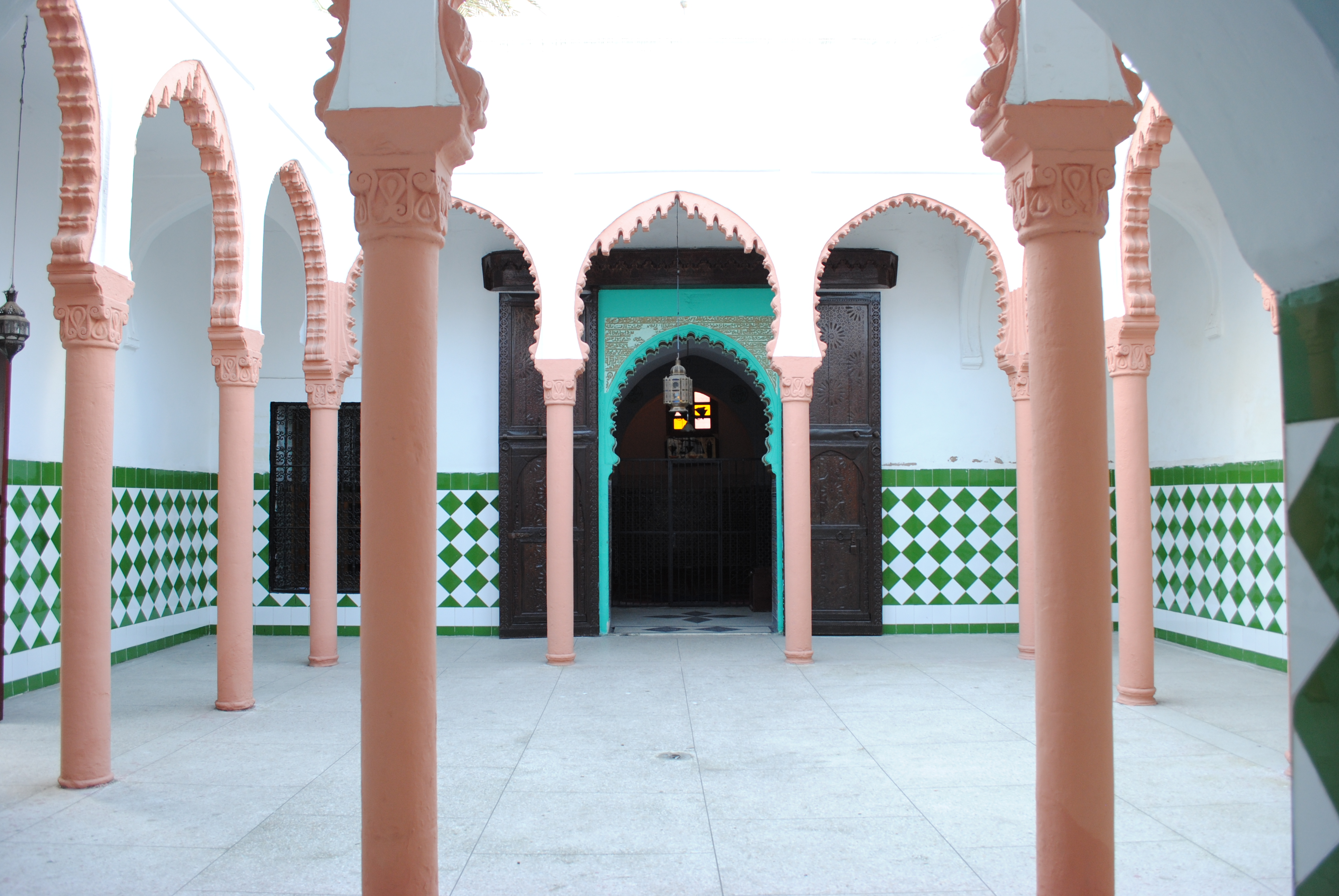
Sidi Belyut Mausoleum

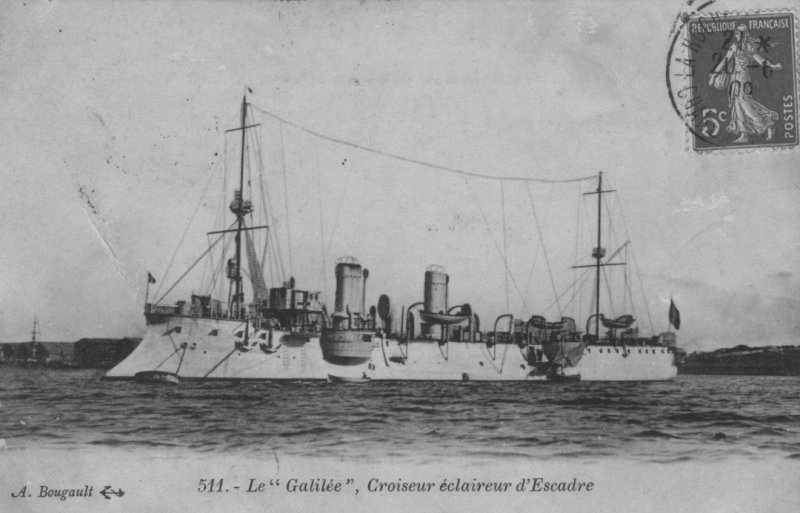
The Galilée, a French cruiser stationed at Casablanca in response to the Casablanca Cemetery Rail Riots of June 1907.

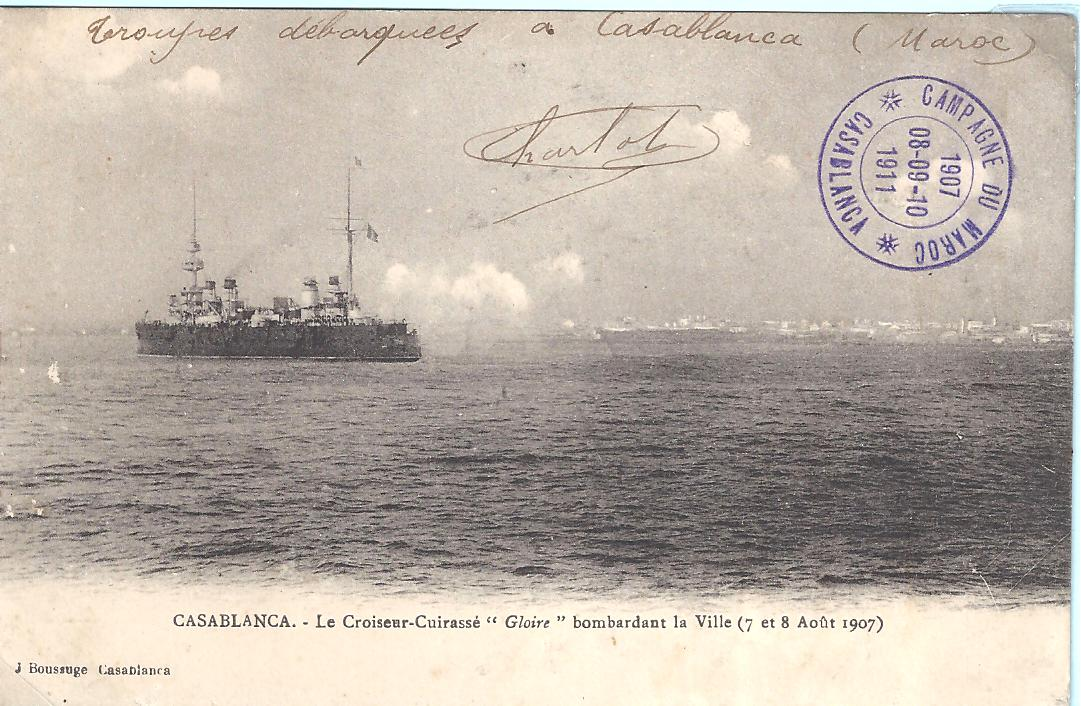
A postcard showing the French cruiser Gloire shelling the city with artillery fire during the bombardment of Casablanca August 1907.

Following the Treaty of Algeciras in 1906, which granted the French holding company La Compagnie Marocaine rights to build modern ports in Casablanca and in Asfi, construction at the port of Casablanca began on May 2, 1907. A narrow gauge railway extending from the port to a quarry in Roches Noires for stones to build the breakwater, passed over the Sidi Belyout necropolis, an area held sacred by the Moroccans. In addition, the French had started to control the customs.

On July 28, a delegation representing the tribes of the Chaouia, led by Hajj Hamou of the Ouled Hariz tribe, pressed Abu Bakr Bin Buzaid, qaid of Casablanca and representative of Sultan Abdelaziz and the Makhzen in the city, with three demands: the removal of the French officers from the customs house, an immediate halt on the construction of the port, and the destruction of the railroad.

The pasha equivocated and postponed his decision to mid-day on July 30, by which time regional tribesmen had entered the city and started an insurrection. A group waited for the train to make its way out to Roches Noires to pick up rocks from the quarry, then piled rocks onto the tracks behind it to isolate it. When the train returned, it was ambushed, and the French, Spanish, and Italian workers aboard were killed and the train destroyed.

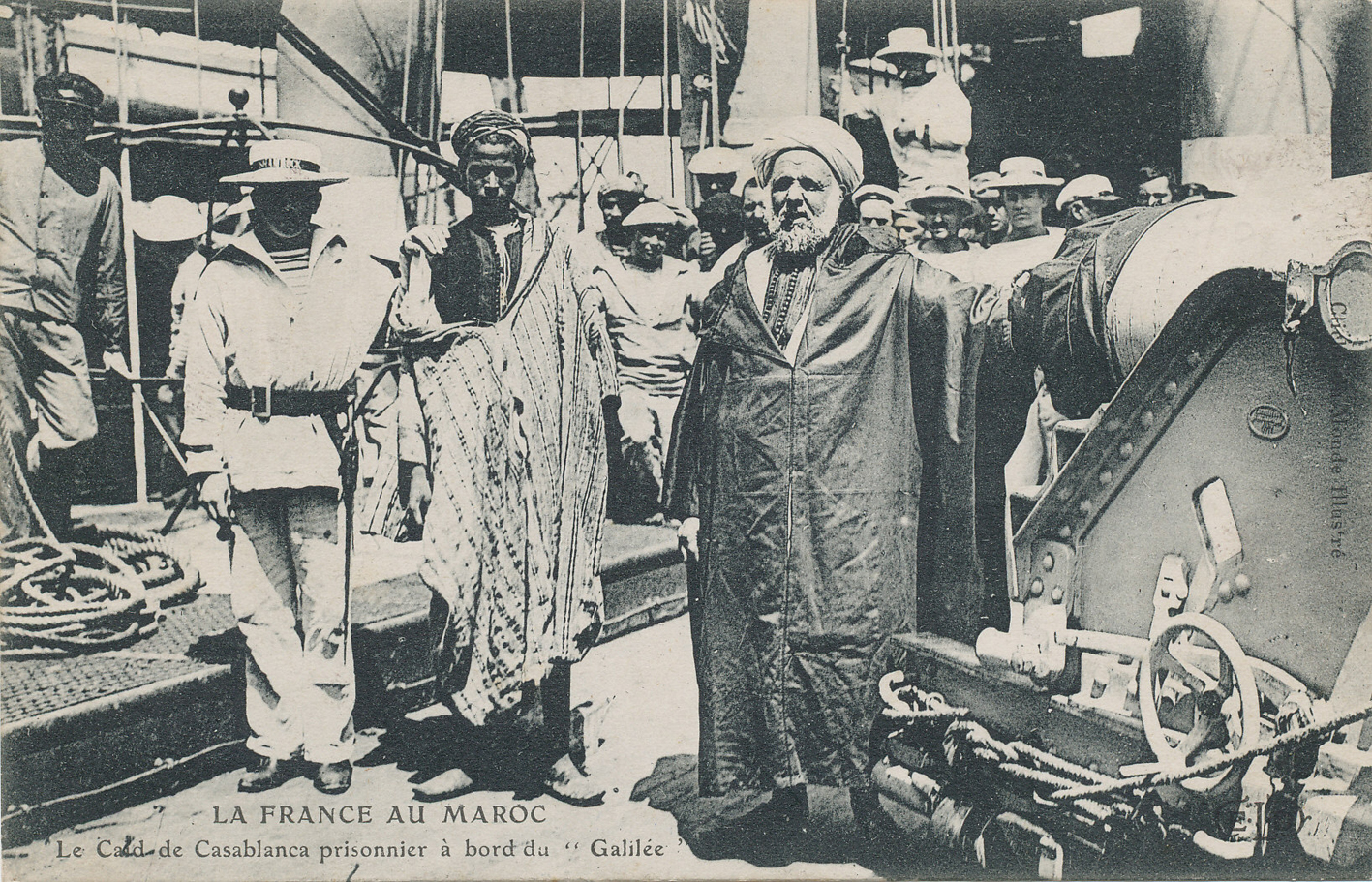
The pacha and representative of the Makhzen in Casablanca, Si Boubker Ben Bouzid Slaoui, captive on the French cruiser Galilée.

This was the justification the French had been waiting for. From August 5–7, a fleet of French armored cruisers bombarded Casablanca and French troops were landed, marking the beginning of the invasion of Morocco from the west. The French then took control of Casablanca and the Chaouia. This effectively began the process of colonization, although French control of Casablanca was not formalized until the signature of the Treaty of Fez on March 30, 1912.

=== Commercial explosion ===
The city overflowed outside of its walls; a West African quarter and a mass of sordid adobe constructions were built around Bab Marrakesh. The market gate was surrounded by warehouses and shops. Inside the walls was the Moroccan city, semi-modern in places, with winding streets, pointed or poorly paved, that the slightest rain changed into mud-holes, with narrow squares, tightened between terraced houses, low and without architecture. Apart from the mosques, a few residential doors, and the German consulate, no monument attracted the gaze of the visitor "lieutenant segongs, 1910".

=== Colonial port ===
Hubert Lyautey was the first French military governor in Morocco, with the title résident général. In 1913, Lyautey invited Henri Prost to handle the urban planning of Moroccan cities, and his work in Casablanca was lauded for applying principles of urbanization. The ville européenne or "European city" fanned out Eastward around Casablanca's medina, or—as the French called it—la ville indigène. The area just outside the eastern walls of the medina, which had previously been used as a market space, Assouq Elkbiir (السوق الكبير) the "big market", was transformed into Place de France, now known as United Nations Square. Dominated by the clock tower built in 1908, it demarked a contact point between the Moroccan medina and the European nouvelle ville.

In 1915, the French authorities held the Exposition Franco-Marocaine, a display of French soft power after the bombardment of the city in 1907 and during the ongoing pacification or wars of occupation—notably the Zaian War—and an opportunity to inventory Morocco's resources and crafts.

The city has experienced a population increase since 1907; part of its growth was a result of European immigration and French colonial policies. As the capital of French-administered Morocco, the city attracted European professionals, merchants and settlers to settle in Casablanca. The European population was of varied origin; French descent formed the majority of that population, alongside a significant population of Spanish, Italian and Portuguese descent. In 1914, Europeans formed 40% of the total Casablanca population; the European population had their own schools, churches, hospitals and places of recreation.

In 1930, Casablanca hosted a round of the Formula One World Championship. The race was held at the new Anfa Racecourse. In 1958, the race was held at Ain-Diab circuit - (see Moroccan Grand Prix). In 1983, Casablanca hosted the Mediterranean Games.

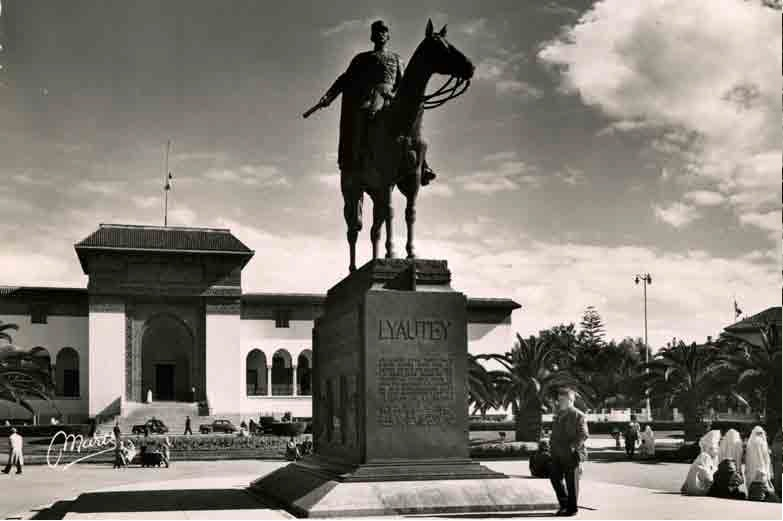
An equestrian statue of Hubert Lyautey Antoine Marchisio and François Cogné, installed at Place Lyautey in 1938.

Under Lyautey's tenure, Casablanca transformed into Morocco's economic center and Africa's biggest port. Casablanca's street plan is based on that of a French architect named Henri Prost, who placed the center of the city where the main market of Anfa had been. From this point all main streets radiate to the east and to the south.

A 1937-1938 typhoid fever outbreak was exploited by colonial authorities to justify the appropriation of urban spaces in Casablanca. Bidonvilles were cheated out of the center and their residents displaced.

=== World War II ===
Casablanca was an important strategic port during World War II. In November 1942, the British and Americans organised a 3-pronged attack on North Africa (Operation Torch), of which the westernmost one was at Casablanca.

The Task Force landed before daybreak on 8 November 1942, at three points in Morocco: Asfi (Operation Blackstone), Fedala (Operation Brushwood, the largest landing with 19,000 men), and Mehdiya-Port Lyautey (Operation Goalpost). Because it was hoped that the French would not resist, there were no preliminary bombardments. This proved to be a costly error as French defenses took a toll of American landing forces.

On the night of 7 November, pro-Allied General Antoine Béthouart attempted a coup d'etat against the French command in Morocco, so that he could surrender to the Allies the next day. His forces surrounded the villa of General Charles Noguès, the Vichy-loyal high commissioner. However, Noguès telephoned loyal forces, who stopped the coup. In addition, the coup attempt alerted Noguès to the impending Allied invasion, and he immediately bolstered French coastal defenses.

Front pages of Le Petit Marocain

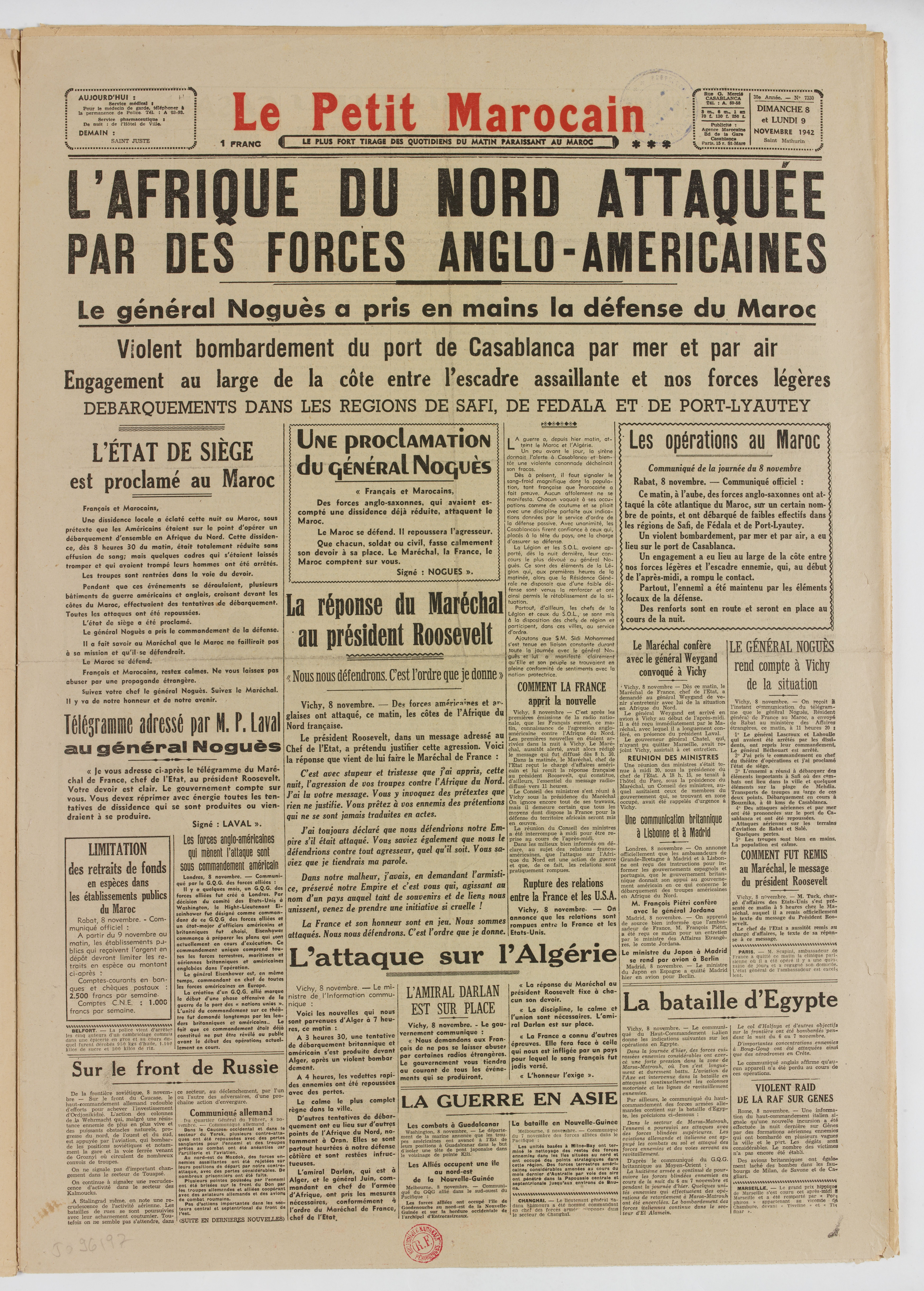
November 8, 1942: North Africa Attacked by Anglo-American Forces

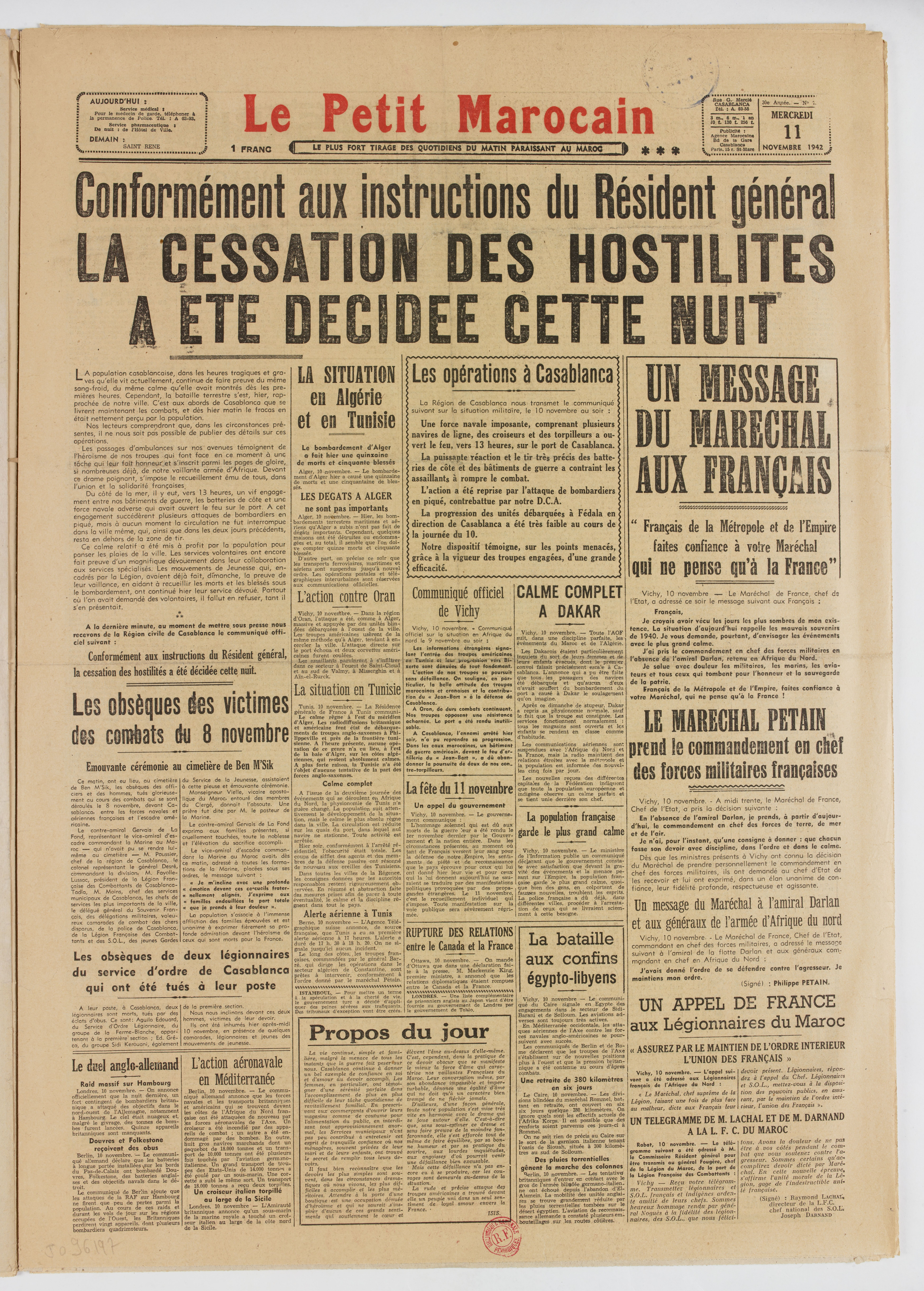
November 11, 1942: Ceasefire Decided Tonight

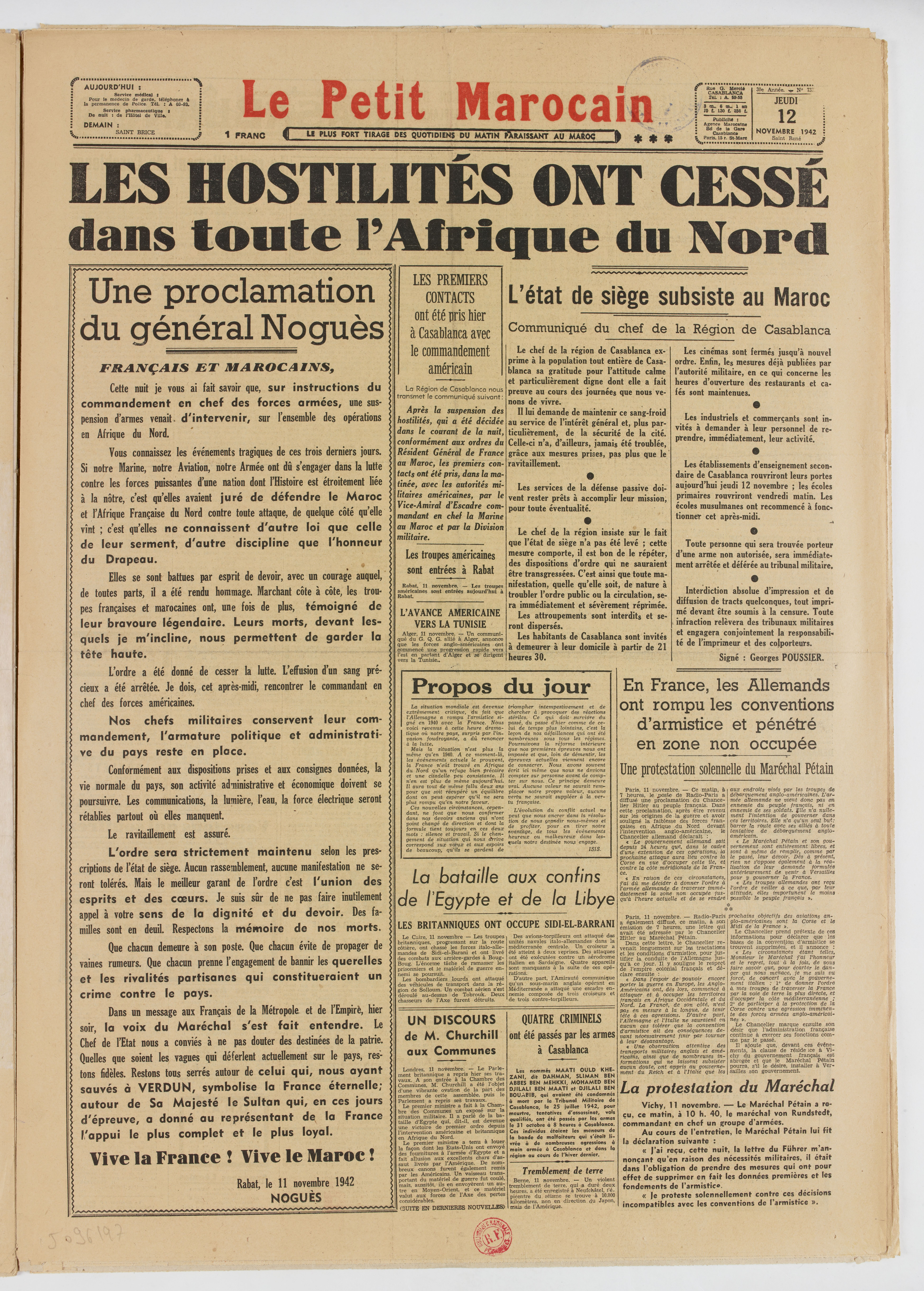
November 12, 1942: Hostilities Have Ceased Throughout North Africa

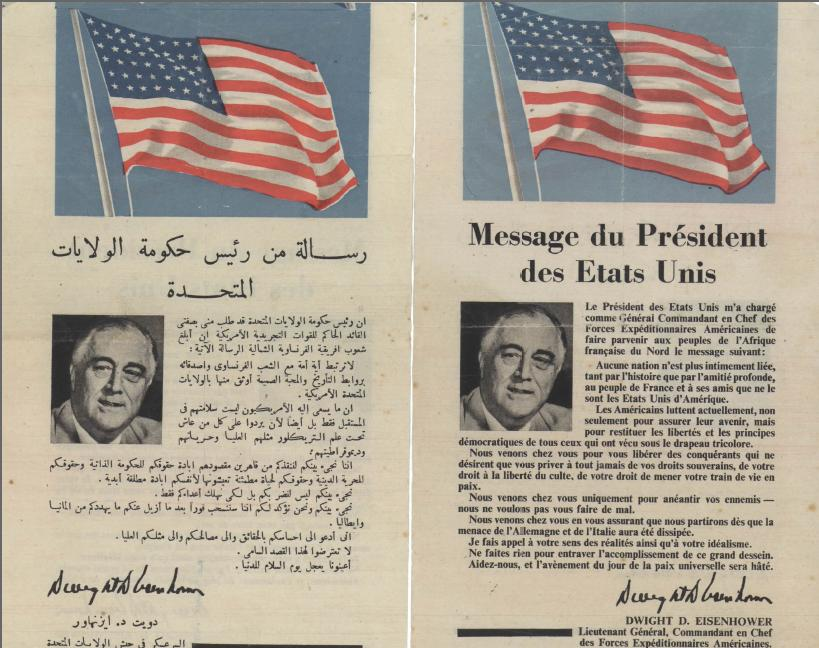
A flyer in French and Arabic that was distributed by Allied forces in the streets of Casablanca, calling on citizens to cooperate with the Allied forces.

At Safi, the objective being capturing the port facilities to land the Western Task Force's medium tanks, the landings were mostly successful. The landings were begun without covering fire, in the hope that the French would not resist at all. However, once French coastal batteries opened fire, Allied warships returned fire. By the time General Ernest Harmon's 2nd Armored Division arrived, French snipers had pinned the assault troops (most of whom were in combat for the first time) on Safi's beaches. Most of the landings occurred behind schedule. Carrier aircraft destroyed a French truck convoy bringing reinforcements to the beach defenses. Safi surrendered on the afternoon of 8 November. By 10 November, the remaining defenders were pinned down, and the bulk of Harmon's forces raced to join the siege of Casablanca.

At Port-Lyautey, the landing troops were uncertain of their position, and the second wave was delayed. This gave the French defenders time to organize resistance, and the remaining landings were conducted under artillery bombardment. With the assistance of air support from the carriers, the troops pushed ahead, and the objectives were captured.

At Fedala, weather disrupted the landings. The landing beaches again came under French fire after daybreak. Patton landed at 08:00, and the beachheads were secured later in the day. The Americans surrounded the port of Casablanca by 10 November, and the city surrendered an hour before the final assault was due to take place.

Casablanca hosted the Casablanca Conference -called even "Anfa Conference"- in 1943 (from January 14 to January 24), in which Churchill and Roosevelt discussed the progress of the war. Casablanca was the site of a large American air base, which was the staging area for all American aircraft for the European Theater of Operations during World War II.

== Post-war period ==
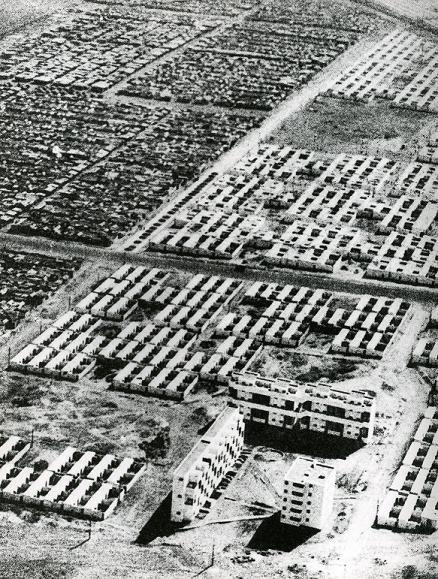
Carrières Centrales in Hay Mohammadi. Michel Écochard, director of the colonial Service de l’Urbanisme et de l’Architecture, led a plan to develop "housing for the greatest number" with a specially designed 8 x 8 meter grid plan for the working poor at the outskirts of the city.

In April 1953, film Salut Casa!—a "pseudo-documentary" propaganda piece intended for French audiences—played at the Cannes Film Festival. The film shows the colonial machine carrying out its mission civilizatrice at full steam. The French government described Casablanca as a "laboratory of urbanism," and the French urbanist Michel Écochard—director of the Service de l'Urbanisme, Casablanca's urban planning office at the time—featured prominently in the film, discussing how challenges such as internal migration and rapid urbanization were being handled in Casablanca.

In July of the same year, Morocco and its Groupe des Architectes Modernes Marocains (GAMMA) had its own section at the Congrès Internationaux d'Architecture Moderne or CIAM. The architects from Morocco presented an intense study of daily life in Casablanca's bidonvilles. To consider the ad-hoc huts built by penniless immigrants from rural parts of the country worthy of study—let alone to hold them as examples for modernist architects to learn from—was radical and revolutionary, and caused a schism among modernists.

Young architects of the controversial Team X, such as Shadrach Woods, Alexis Josic, and Georges Candilis were active in Casablanca designing cités, modular public housing units, that took vernacular life into account. Elie Azagury, the first Moroccan modernist architect, led GAMMA after independence in 1956.

== Toward Independence ==
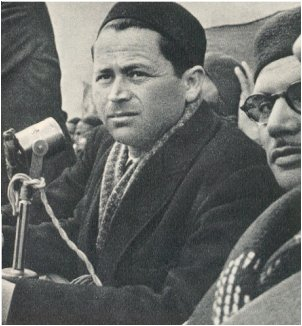
The Maghrebi labor unionist Farhat Hached's assassination at the hands of French foreign intelligence sparked violent protests in Casablanca December 1952.

During the 1940s and 1950s, Casablanca was a major center of anti-colonial struggle.

In 1947, when the Sultan went to the Tangier International Zone to deliver a speech requesting independence from colonial powers, the first stage of the Revolution of the King and the People, French colonial forces instigated a conflict between Senegalese Tirailleurs serving the French colonial empire and Moroccan locals in a failed attempt to sabotage the Sultan's journey to Tangier. This massacre, remembered in Casablanca as Darbat Salighan (Moroccan Arabic: ضربة ساليغان), lasted for about 24 hours from April 7–8, 1947, as the tirailleurs fired randomly into residential buildings in working-class neighborhoods, killing between 180 and 1000 Moroccan civilians. The Sultan returned to Casablanca to comfort the families of the victims, then proceeded to Tangier to deliver the historic speech.

The assassination of the Tunisian labor unionist Farhat Hached by La Main Rouge—the clandestine militant wing of French intelligence—sparked protests in cities around the world and riots in Casablanca from December 7–8, 1952. The Union Générale des Syndicats Confédérés du Maroc (UGSCM) and the Istiqlal Party organized a general strike in the Carrières Centrales in Hay Mohammadi on December 7.

Riots overrun Casablanca due to discontent with French rule. Universal Newsreel, 21 July 1955

According to the political writer Marvine Howe, after the exile of Sultan Mohammed V, "The nationalist movement, with its political leadership silenced, turned to violence, and the Moroccan resistance was reborn". This turn to violence was through urban terrorism. These terrorist attacks included things like arson, shootings, knifings, sabotage, stonings and bomb explosions. The urban resistance launched 4,520 violent attacks targeting infrastructure in Moroccan cities, mostly Casablanca, between 20 August 1953 and 6 April 1956. There were also terrorist bombings and attempted assassinations against the French colon community. According to the historian William A. Hoisington Jr, between December 1953 and March 1955, there were 1222 terrorist (and counter-terrorist) attacks mostly in Casablanca (dubbed "Morocco's Chicago") which claimed 259 deaths and 732 wounded. The historian Susan Gilson Miller says "violent attacks became a daily occurrence". Under the French protectorate, Casablanca functioned as a "focal point" for European settlers, mostly of French origin, to migrate to. By 1950, Casablanca had a population of 158,000 Europeans as opposed to 414,500 Muslims and 72,000 Jews. The high presence of French settlers was a factor that affected nationalist violence. Morocco had the second largest settler population in the French empire.

A number of urban groups were formed. This included the Secret Organisation which was founded by the Istiqlal Party, the left wing Black Crescent, Usad al-tahrir and the Organization of the Black Hand. One notable attack was one in the central market of Casablanca, on Christmas Eve of September, where there was a huge explosion that killed 23 people. This act was claimed by the resistance and the head of the Secret Organisation, Muhammad Zarqtuni, was arrested and accused of planning the attack. Rather than reveal the secrets of the organisation, he committed suicide. Zarqtuni's sister, Khaddouj, was also a member of the resistance in Casablanca.

== Since independence ==
Morocco regained independence from France on 2 March 1956.

=== Casablanca Group ===
January 4–7, 1961, the city hosted an ensemble of progressive African leaders during the Casablanca Conference of 1961. King Muhammad V received attendance were Gamal Abd An-Nasser of the United Arab Republic, Kwame Nkrumah of Ghana, Modibo Keïta of Mali, and Ahmed Sékou Touré of Guinea, as well as Ferhat Abbas, president of the Provisional Government of the Algerian Republic. Notably absent was Patrice Lumumba of the Republic of the Congo, who had been in prison since September 1960. This conference gave birth to the pan-Africanist Casablanca Group or the "Casablanca Bloc" and ultimately to the African Union.

=== Jewish emigration ===
Casablanca was a major departure point for Jews leaving Morocco through Operation Yachin, an operation conducted by Mossad to secretly migrate Moroccan Jews to Israel between November 1961 and spring 1964.

=== 1965 riots ===
The 1965 student protests, which spread to cities around the country and devolved into riots, started on March 22, 1965, in front of Lycée Mohammed V in Casablanca; there were almost 15,000 students there, according to a witness. The protests started as a peaceful march to demand the right to public higher education for Morocco, but were violently dispersed. The following day, students returned to Lycée Mohammed V along with workers, the unemployed, and the poor, this time vandalizing stores, burning buses and cars, throwing stones, and chanting slogans against King Hassan II, who since assuming the throne in 1961, had consolidated political power within monarchy and gone to war with the newly independent, newly socialist Algeria. The National Union of the Students of Morocco—a nationalist, anti-colonial student group affiliated with Mehdi Ben Barka's party, the National Union of Popular Forces—overtly opposed and criticized Hassan II.

The riots were repressed with tanks deployed for two days, and General Mohamed Oufkir fired on the crowd from a helicopter.

The king blamed the events on teachers and parents, and declared in a speech to the nation on March 30, 1965: "Allow me to tell you that there is no greater danger to the State than a so-called intellectual. It would have been better if you were all illiterate."

=== 1965 Arab League Summit ===
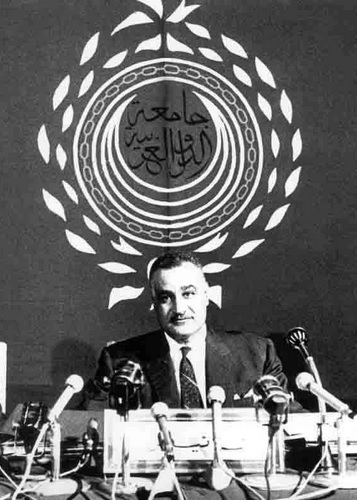
Egyptian President Gamal Abd An-Nasser addressing the 1965 Arab League Summit in Casablanca.

A secret Arab League summit was held in Casablanca September 1965. Shlomo Gazit of Israeli intelligence said that Hassan II invited Mossad and Shin Bet agents to bug the Casablanca hotel where the conference would be held to record the conversations of the Arab leaders. This information was instrumental in the heavy military defeats of Egypt, Jordan and Syria to the Israelis in the Six-Day War. Prior to the war, King Hassan II had developed a reciprocal relationship with the Israeli intelligence, who had assisted him in carrying out an operation in France to abduct and 'disappear' Mehdi Ben Barka, a leftist Moroccan leader who had been based in Paris.

=== Years of Lead ===
During the "Years of Lead," Derb Moulay Cherif Prison in Hay Muhammadi was used as a secret prison for the interrogation and torture of dissidents of Hassan II. Among others, the Jewish Moroccan activist Abraham Serfaty of the radical Moroccan leftist group Ila al-Amam was tortured there. The poet and activist Saida Menebhi died there on December 11, 1977, after a 34-day hunger strike.

The music of Nass El Ghiwane represents some of the art that was created in opposition to the oppressive regime.

==== 1981 riots ====
On May 29, 1981, riots broke out in Casablanca. At a time when Morocco was strained from six years in the Western Sahara War, a general strike was organized in response to increases in the cost of basic foods. Thousands of young people from the bidonvilles surrounding Casablanca formed mobs and stoned symbols of wealth in the city, including buses, banks, pharmacies, grocery stores, and expensive cars. Police and military units fired into the crowds. The official death toll according to the government was 66, while the opposition reported it was 637, most of whom were youths from the slums shot to death. This intifada was the first of two IMF riots in Morocco—dubbed the "Hunger Revolts" by the international press—the second of which took place in 1984 primarily in northern cities such as Nador, Husseima, Tetuan, and al-Qasr al-Kebir.

=== Globalization and modernization ===
The first McDonald's franchise on the African continent and in the Arab world opened on Ain Diab in 1992.

The city is now developing a tourism industry. Casablanca has become the economic and business capital of Morocco, while Rabat is the political capital.

In March 2000, women's groups organised demonstrations in Casablanca proposing reforms to the legal status of women in the country. 40,000 women attended, calling for a ban on polygamy and the introduction of divorce law (divorce being a purely religious procedure at that time). Although counter-demonstration attracted half a million participants, the movement for change started in 2000 was influential on King Mohammed VI, and he enacted a new Mudawana, or family law, in early 2004, meeting some of the demands of women's rights activists.

On May 16, 2003, 33 civilians were killed and more than 100 people were injured when Casablanca was hit by a multiple suicide bomb attack carried out by Moroccans and claimed by some to have been linked to al-Qaeda.

A string of suicide bombings struck the city in early 2007. A suspected militant blew himself up at a Casablanca internet cafe on March 11, 2007. On April 10, three suicide bombers blew themselves up during a police raid of their safe house. Two days later, police set up barricades around the city and detained two more men who had escaped the raid. On April 14, two brothers blew themselves up in downtown Casablanca, one near the American Consulate, and one a few blocks away near the American Language Center. Only one person was injured aside from the bombers, but the consulate was closed for more than a month.

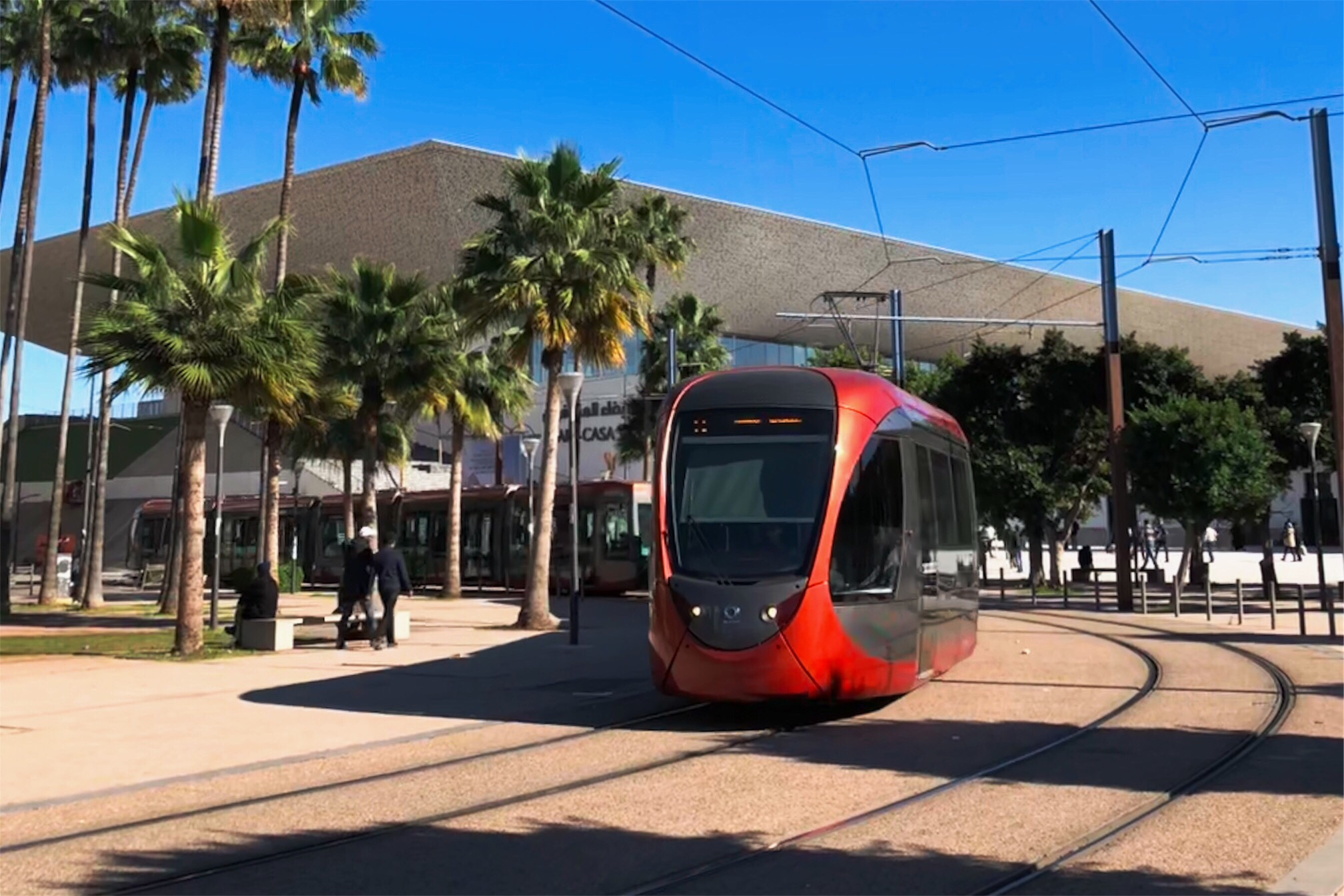
A tram on line ط1 passes in front of the recently renovated Casa Voyageurs train station in 2018.

The first line of the Casablanca Tramway, which as of 2019 consists of two lines, was inaugurated December 2012. Al-Boraq, a high speed rail service connecting Casablanca and Tangier and the high-speed rail service on the African continent, was inaugurated on November 15, 2018.

== See also ==
- Acheulean
- Aterian
- Mesolithic
- Mousterian
- Timeline of Casablanca
