= Groupe des Architectes Modernes Marocains =

Moroccan collective of architects

The Group of Moroccan Modern Architects (French: Groupe des Architectes Modernes Marocains) or GAMMA was a collective of modernist architects working in Morocco. It began under the direction of Michel Écochard, director of urban planning in Morocco during the later years of the French protectorate, and was led by Elie Azagury after Morocco's independence.

== History ==
GAMMA initially included the architects George Candillis, Alexis Josic and Shadrach Woods. In the early 1950s, Écochard commissioned GAMMA to design housing that provided a "culturally specific living tissue" for laborers and migrants from the countryside. Sémiramis, Nid d’Abeille (Honeycomb), and Carrières Centrales were some of the first examples of this style that came to be called vernacular modernism. Ecochard's 8x8 meter model, designed to address Casablanca's issues with overpopulation and rural exodus, was pioneering in the architecture of collective housing. It was the first time the French Protectorate built housing for the colonized rather than the colonizers, and it did so to suppress the Moroccan Nationalist Movement, particularly after the 1952 protests following the assassination of the labor unionist Farhat Hached, which were centered in the bidonville of Carrières Centrales (now Hay Mohammadi).

At this time, Elie Azagury was the only "native" Moroccan architect in GAMMA. He and Candilis pushed Écochard for higher density development at Carrières Centrales. Azagury considered verticalization "an economic and social necessity," and was critical of Écochard and his idea that Moroccans could not live in high-rises, considering Écochard "an active instrument of the French colonial power."

Azagury led GAMMA after Morocco's independence in 1956. He feared throughout the following decade that independence would come with a return to vernacular architecture instead of modernism, but was relieved that this wasn't the case.

Other architects associated with GAMMA include Jean-François Zevaco, Abdeslam Faraoui, Patrice de Mazières, and Mourad Ben Embarek.
