= Casablanca Uprisings of 1952 =

Anti-colonial protests in Morocco

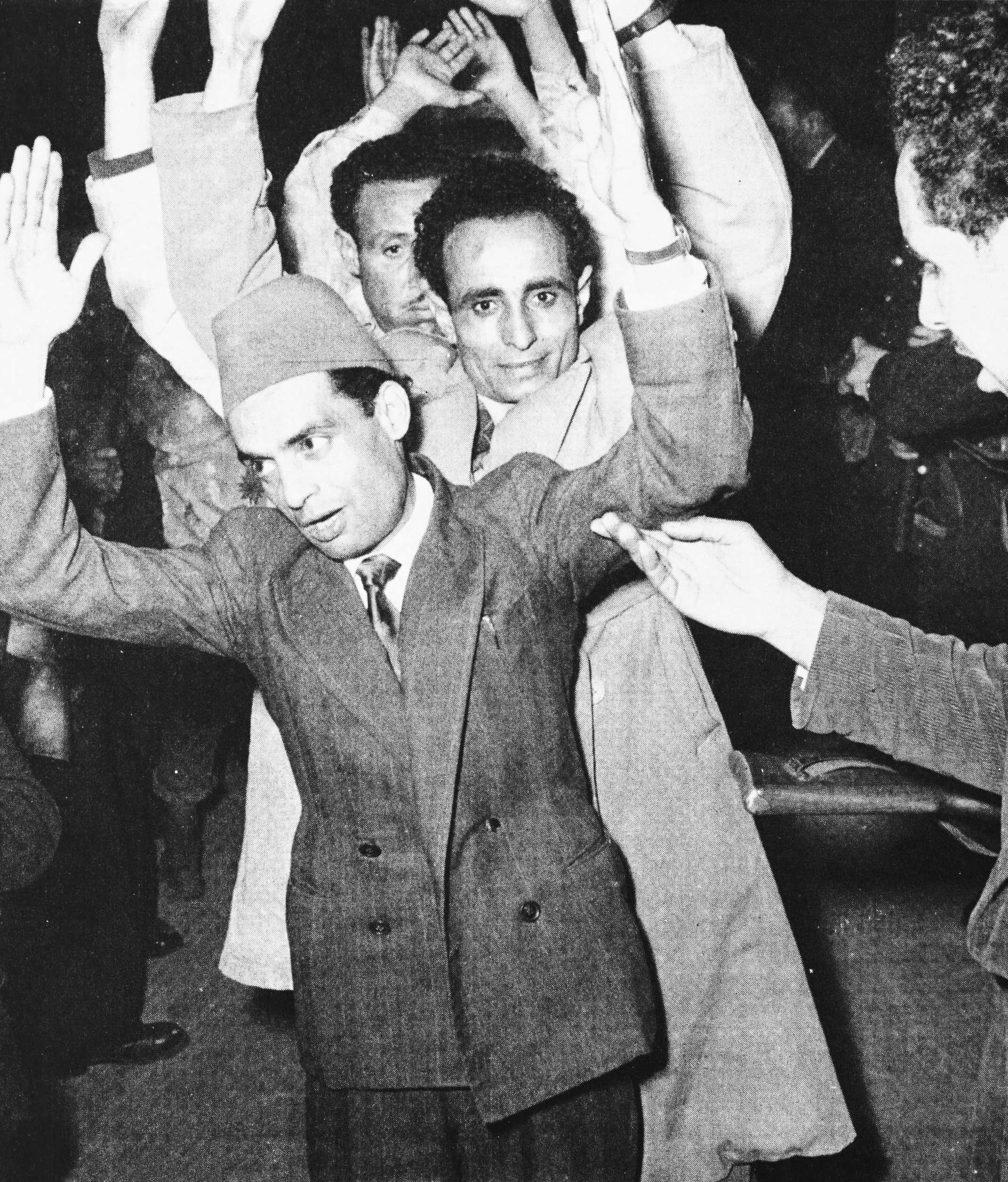
Arrest of Istiqlal leaders after the riots, 9 December 1952

The Casablanca Uprisings of 1952 (Arabic: انتفاضة الدار البيضاء 1952) were a violently repressed anti-colonial popular movement that took place on the 7th and 8th of December 1952 in Casablanca, Morocco in response to the French assassination of the Tunisian labor unionist Farhat Hached in Tunis on 5 December. The Union Générale des Syndicats Confédéres au Maroc (UGSCM) labor union and the Istiqlal Party organized two days of strike and protests. Over 3,500 workers assembled in demonstrations that were violently dispersed by the French police. Hundreds of Europeans rampaged into Moroccan neighborhoods leading to hundreds protestors killed or wounded.

Street children and dock workers also participated in the Casablanca protests of December 1952.

== Context ==
The Tunisian labor unionist and anti-colonial activist Farhat Hached was assassinated by La Main Rouge, operated by the French Service de Documentation Extérieure et de Contre-Espionnage, in Tunis on 5 December 1952.

== Carrières Centrales ==
The protests were centered in the working class neighborhood Carrières Centrales (now Hay Mohammadi)—then on the outskirts of Casablanca—a neighborhood populated partially by migrants from rural areas seeking employment in the city and partially by Moroccans displaced from the city center in 1938 when the French authorities used a typhoid epidemic as justification to destroy shantytowns near the European ville nouvelle. Up until the early 1950s, Carrières Centrales was a massive shantytown; the French authorities considered it a den of nationalist fervor and popular resistance and therefore a threat to the colonial order.

Michel Écochard, director of urban planning in Morocco under the French Protectorate from 1946-1952 and leader of the Groupe des Architectes Modernes Marocains (GAMMA), worked on housing for laborers and migrants from the countryside. The slums at Carrières Centrales became the first collective housing project made with Ecochard's 8x8 meter model, designed to address Casablanca's issues with overpopulation and rural exodus. It was also the first time the French Protectorate built housing in Casablanca for the colonized rather than the colonizers; the objective was to suppress the Moroccan Nationalist Movement.

== Aftermath ==
Leaders of the Istiqlal party were arrested. The Judeo-Moroccan human rights activist and intellectual Abraham Serfaty was expelled from Morocco by the French regime for his involvement in the protests. In the aftermath of the riots, French authorities arrested Abbas Messaadi, who eventually escaped, he also found the Moroccan Liberation Army, and joined the armed resistance in the Rif.

British-Pathé referred to the events as "communist riots."
