= Michel Écochard =

French architect and urban planner

- Born: 11 March 1905; Paris, France
- Died: 24 May 1985 (aged 80); Paris, France
- Education: Beaux-Arts de Paris
- Occupations: Architect, urban planner
- Notable work: Théâtre Nanterre-Amandiers; Grand Lycée Franco-Libanais

Michel Écochard (11 March 1905 – 24 May 1985) was a French architect and urban planner. He played a large part in the urban planning of Casablanca from 1946 to 1952 during the French Protectorate, then in the French redevelopment of Damascus during its occupation of Syria. He was also trained as an archeologist.

== Education ==
Michel Écochard graduated from the École des Beaux-Arts in 1929. His training there had inclined him toward modernist ideas of industrialised construction. He was also trained as an archeologist, and was fascinated by Mediterranean vernacular architecture, which was popularised in Paris around that time by Auguste Perret.

== Career ==
=== Syria ===
Écochard began his career at a fairly young age. In 1930, when he was only in his twenties, he began his first public works restoring historic buildings in Damascus, which was then under French colonial rule. He a member of the French reconstruction team that restored the Temple of Bel in Palmyra, the Mosque of Bosra, and the Azm Palace, the last having become a property of the French.

=== Eastern Mediterranean ===
Écochard's first solo project in the colonies was the Museum of Antioch, in which he combined ancient Syrian architectural elements with modernist design. Écochard was a firm believer in the value of historical monuments, an outlook that he maintained while working on the town plan for Damascus. His design for the town ensured protection of its many historical monuments.

==== Military service ====
He served in the Forces Françaises Libres.

==== Beirut ====
In 1943 he worked on the first master plan for Beirut.

=== Morocco ===
He served as the director of the French Protectorate in Morocco's Department of Urban Planning from 1946 to 1952. He changed Casablanca's urban plan from Henri Prost's radio-concentric system—like Paris—to a linear system, with expanded industrial zones stretching east through Aïn Sebaâ toward Fedala. There was a focus on managing the city's rapid, rural exodus-driven urbanization through the development of social housing projects.

==== 1953 CIAM ====
At the 1953 Congrès Internationaux d'Architecture Moderne (CIAM), Écochard presented, along with Georges Candilis, the work of ATBAT-Afrique—the Africa branch of Atelier des Bâtisseurs founded in 1947 by figures including Le Corbusier, Vladimir Bodiansky, and André Wogenscky. It was a study of Casablanca's bidonvilles entitled "Habitat for the Greatest Number." It argued against doctrine, arguing that architects must consider local culture and climate in their designs. This generated great debate among modernist architects around the world and eventually provoked a schism.

==== GAMMA ====
Écochard's collective of Modernist architects was called Groupe des Architectes Modernes Marocains (GAMMA), and initially included the architects George Candillis, Alexis Josic and Shadrach Woods. In the early 1950s, Écochard commissioned GAMMA to design housing that provided a "culturally specific living tissue" for laborers and migrants from the countryside. Sémiramis, Nid d’Abeille (Honeycomb), and Carrières Centrales were some of the first examples of this Vernacular Modernism. This was the first time the French Protectorate built housing for the colonized rather than the colonizers, and it did so to suppress the Moroccan Nationalist Movement, particularly after the 1952 protests following the assassination of the labor unionist Farhat Hached, which were centered in the bidonville of Carrières Centrales (now Hay Mohammadi). The Moroccan GAMMA architect Elie Azagury, with whom he clashed on whether Moroccans could live in high-rises, was critical of Écochard as "an active instrument of the French colonial power." Écochard's 8x8 meter model, designed to address Casablanca's issues with overpopulation and rural exodus, was pioneering in the architecture of collective housing.

=== Lebanon ===
In the later 1950s, he returned to Lebanon and created urban plans for Saida (1956-1958) and Byblos (1959-1960). From 1960 to 1964, he conducted various studies of Lebanon. He produced a masterplan for Beirut and its suburbs in 1963/64, recognizing the need to integrate it into a regional and national strategy.

=== Pakistan ===
From 1950s, Écochard designed the Karachi University master plan and campus buildings.

=== Other places ===
Throughout his career, Écochard also made plans for Pakistan, Sabendé and Fria in Guinea, Martigues, Dakar, Martinique, Damascus, Tabriz, Corsica, Mashhad, Muscat, and Tehran.

== Works ==
- Carrières Centrales, (late 1940s - early 1950s) Casablanca, Morocco
- Kuwait National Museum, Completed 1986

== Publications ==
- Casablanca: le roman d'une ville. 1954. Editions de Paris. 20, Avenue Rapp. Paris, VIIe.
