= Le Mirail =

District of Toulouse, France

Coordinates: 43°34′20″N 1°24′00″E

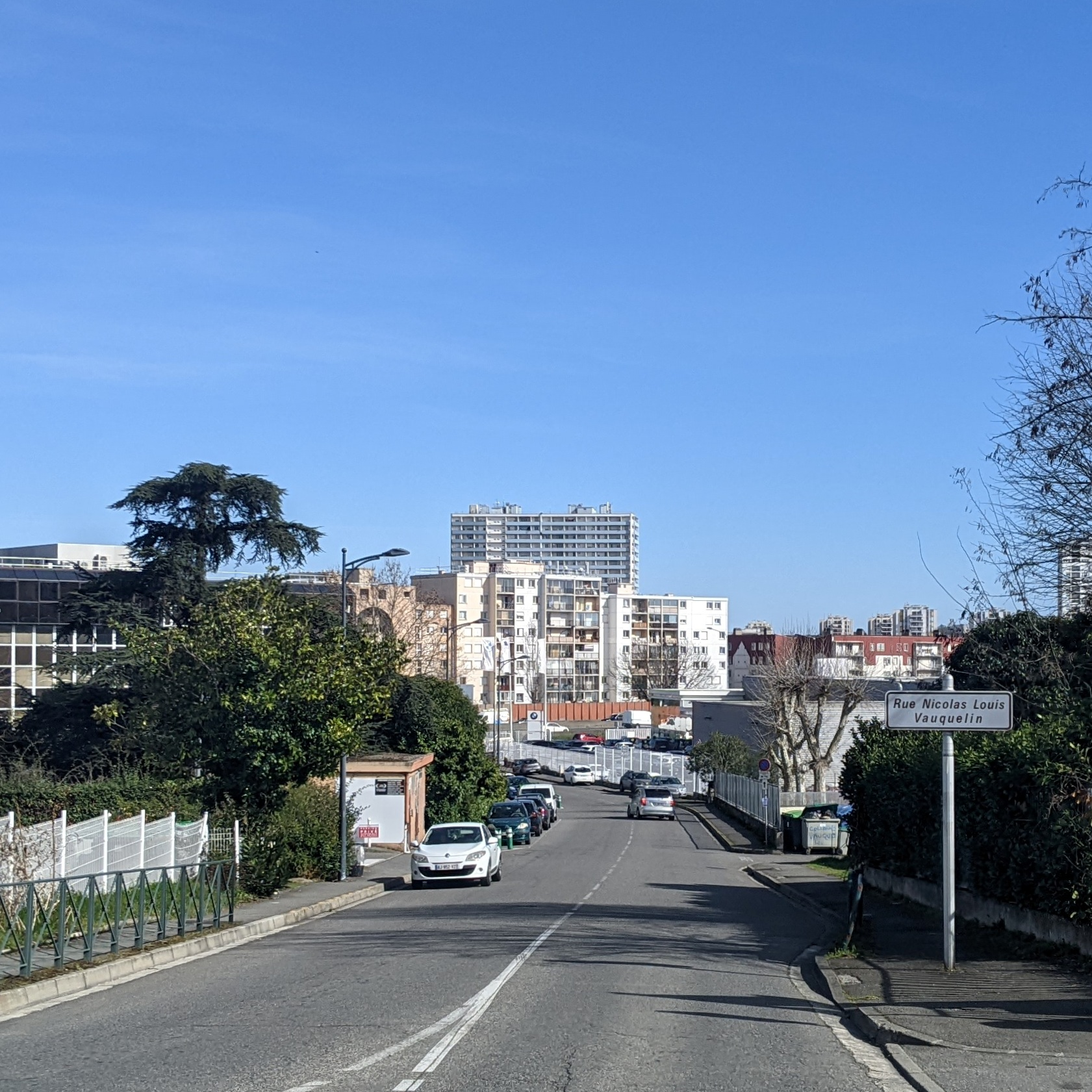
Nicolas-Louis-Vauquelin Street

Le Mirail (French pronunciation: [lə miʁaj]) is a district in Toulouse, France. It was an urban expansion project proposed by the then-mayor Louis Bazerque in 1958, to combat the increasing population, and resulting housing shortage.

In 1962, the Greek-French architect Georges Candilis was given the responsibility of designing the new quarter in Toulouse, along with Shadrach Woods and Alexis Josic.

Finished in 1972, the architectural experiment ended up being around two thirds of its planned size.

One of the largest urban renewal projects (PRU) in the city of Toulouse, that of the Reynerie district, launched in 2019, provides for the demolition of four tripod tower blocks as part of the urban renewal project.
