= Elie Azagury =

First Moroccan modernist architect

- Born: 1918; Casablanca
- Died: 2009 (aged 90–91); Casablanca
- Education: Ecole des Beaux Arts (Paris)
- Occupation: Architect

Elie Azagury (Arabic: إيلي الزاقوري; 1918-2009) was an influential Moroccan architect and director of the Groupe des Architectes Modernes Marocains (GAMMA) after Moroccan independence in 1956. He is considered the first Moroccan modernist architect, with works in cities such as Casablanca, Tangier, and Agadir. Azagury was also a controversial and outspoken Communist, and was active designing cités, or social housing projects made up of modular units, in places like Hay Hassani in Casablanca. These projects combined elements of modern and vernacular architecture, taking local culture and lifestyles into account.

== Biography ==
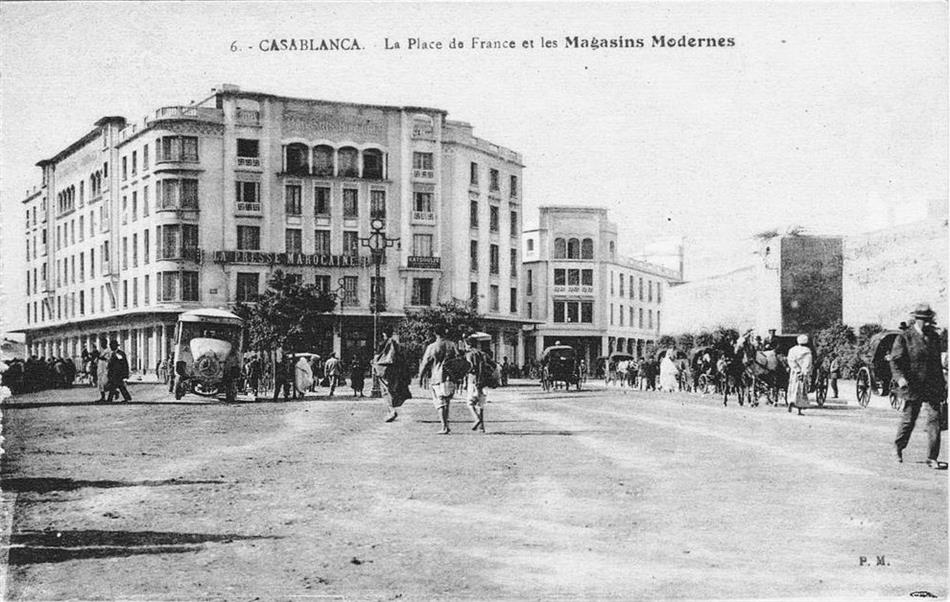
Elie Azagury was born in 1918 at the Magasins Paris-Maroc building, the first building in Casablanca's European ville nouvelle, looking over Place de France.

=== Early life ===
Elie Azagury was born in Casablanca in 1918 to a Jewish family from the north of Morocco. His father, Judah-Haïm Azagury, was a businessman, the manager of a mercantile house in Casablanca. The surname Azagury is probably related to Zagora, the historical capital of the Draa Valley region.

He grew up with his close friend and eventual colleague Jean-François Zevaco.

He worked briefly as an apprentice for Marius Boyer, a major figure in the architecture of Casablanca in the period from the 1920s through the 1940s.

=== Studies ===
He left Casablanca for Paris in 1937, as there was no architecture school in Morocco. He worked as an apprentice at the Atelier of Hérault, Boutrin in Paris for two years while studying for the entrance exams of the Ecole des Beaux Arts, which he finally passed on his 4th attempt in 1939, placing 17th out of 1,000. The following year, he escaped Paris as it was in the Nazi-occupied Zone Nord, heading south for Marseille alone on his bicycle.

On his way, an architect in Pau offered him food, a place to stay, and a job, which Azagury held for a month and a half. In Marseille, he worked at the Atelier d’Architecture de l’École des Beaux Arts for two years, where he was inspired by American architecture—especially the work of Richard Neutra and Frank Lloyd Wright.

He then took a job in Megève, where he worked for an architect named Michel Aimé for two years during World War II. The day after a neighbor exposed that he was Jewish, police officers came to him recommending that he skip town as they had received orders to arrest him. He took what possessions he could carry and returned to Paris on foot, taking backroads so as to avoid checkpoints. He finished his degree at the Ecole des Beaux Arts in Paris in the Studio of Auguste Perret in 1944, at the time of the Liberation of Paris. In the period immediately after his graduation, Azagury supported himself by washing dishes at the university cafeteria.

=== Early career ===
Shortly afterward, he moved to Stockholm to work with Ralph Erskine for 2 years. Azagury was influenced by the artists and creatives he met in Stockholm, including Ingmar Bergman and Vivianna Torun Bülow-Hübe. Inspiration from Swedish architecture can be seen later in his projects Groupe scolaire de Longchamp (1954) and Groupe scolaire des Roches Noires (1963; now the Ibrahim Roudani School).

On his way back to Morocco, Azagury returned to Paris to assist Paul Nelson with the opening of his office, and stayed in Paris for 2 years. There, he socialized with leftist intellectuals such as Jacques Prévert, Fernand Léger, Georges Braque, and Tristan Tzara. He then continued his journey south and met with Le Corbusier for a day in Marseille, where they toured the construction site of Maison du Fada (Unité d'habitation). Azagury was inspired by Le Corbusier's thinking on "vertical living" and use of concrete, and since always employed the golden ratio in his architectural designs.

He returned to Casablanca in 1949. His first projects were designing furniture and private villas, such as Villa Dahon and Villa Shullman (1951). He also won a competition to design the science building for Lycée Lyautey on Blvd. Mers Sultan (now Muhammad V High School).

=== GAMMA ===
Azagury was the only "native" Moroccan in the Groupe des Architectes Modernes Marocains (GAMMA). He and Georges Candilis pushed Michel Écochard, director of urban planning at the end of the French Protectorate, for higher density housing in the "Housing for the Greatest Number" project at Carrières Centrales, presented at the 1953 Congrès International d'Architecture Moderne. Azagury described his relationship with Écochard as "tumultuous;" while he respected his intellect and work ethic, Ecochard was "clearly an active instrument of the French colonial power." Ecochard was convinced that Moroccans could not live in high-rises, while Azagury considered verticalization "an economic and social necessity."

Azagury led GAMMA after Morocco's independence in 1956. He feared throughout the following decade that independence would come with a return to vernacular architecture instead of modernism, but was relieved that this wasn't the case.

Azagury's Derb Jdid housing project (1957-1960) in Hay Hassani was a response to Ecochard's belief that Moroccans could not live in vertical housing.

=== Agadir reconstruction ===
He often worked with his close friend Jean-François Zevaco, including in the reconstruction of Agadir after the earthquake that destroyed it in 1960. Azagury arrived in Agadir on March 8, 1960–8 days after the earthquake—and was "traumatized" by the devastation. He was compelled to design architecture that "inspired strength, endurance, and domination over the forces of nature; an architecture that could help the healing process for survivors." Azagury was disappointed that the project was led by Pierre Mas, who "was trained neither as an architect nor as a planner," and who severed the core of the city from the beach with a tourist district.

Azagury led the Cabo Negro Mediterranean resort project from 1970 to 1980.

== Legacy ==
On December 20, 2019, MAMMA. sponsored an event dedicated to the architectural legacy of Elie Azagury, the first Moroccan modernist architect. This event included guided tours of the Ibrahim Roudani School and a lecture hosted at the Saudi Library.

== See also ==
- Architecture of Casablanca
- Jean-François Zevaco
- MAMMA.
