= Vladimir Bodiansky =

Russian-born French engineer, aviator, architech

Vladimir Bodiansky (March 25, 1894 – December 9, 1966) was a French engineer, originally from Kharkiv (in modern-day Ukraine), known for his contributions to modern architecture.

== Early life and education ==
Vladamir Bodiansky was born in Kharkiv. He began his education in 1910 at the Moscow Highway Institute. After spending four years there, Bodianksy left with a civil engineering degree in 1914, and began building railways for the Russian Protectorate of Bokhara. Because he was enrolled as a volunteer member of the Russian Cavalry, he was sent off to fight in World War I in 1915. He fought in Russia until three months after the October 1917 Revolution, receiving his first degree in aviation in November 1917 from the Aviation School of Tiflis. He arrived in France in January 1918, and three months later Bodiansky joined the French Foreign Legion. As a member of the Foreign Legion, Bodiansky had many different roles in the aviation division, including as a military aviator pilot, a hydroplane pilot, a seaplane pilot, and a civil aviation pilot. He demobilised from the French Legion on November 27, 1919, however he remained in France. He decided to attend the College of Aeronautics Mechanical Construction, receiving a diploma in 1920. He elected to apply for Naturalization on April 11, 1927 and was naturalized on June 26, 1929. After a three-year stint in the Congo building highways, Bodianski returned to France in 1923, where he started working with design offices and aircraft companies, specifically one owned by the Caudron brothers. From 1925 to 1930, Bondiansky worked as a project manager for the aviation studios of François Villiers in Meudon, where he was able to take out three patents with Villier himself. Following Villier's death, Bodiansky started designing prototypes for a two-seater fighter plane for the French Army.

== Change in career ==
Due to his work in the field of aviation, Bodiansky was able to meet Marcel Lods, an architect who shared his interest in the field. This encounter marked a change in Bodiansky's career, as he took on the role of an engineer in the field of architecture. Through Lods, Bodiansky met Eugene Mopin, an accomplished contractor who was working on making concrete for a housing complex in Drancy. Because this was the first time that Mopin was using his experimental method of construction and Bodiansky's name was associated with it, this furthered Bodiansky's role in the field of architecture. This continued when Bodiansky began working as the head of design in Mopin's office starting in March 1933. He worked there until July 1937, when he was hired by Lods' agency to be a salaried engineer, where he worked until July 1940. This marked another shift in Bodiansky's career, as he then began his career as a freelance engineer.

== Maison du Peuple ==
In 1935, Charles Auffray, the Mayor of Clichy, commissioned Lods and architect Eugène Beaudouin to build a covered market at meeting hall on the site of the former open air market of the rue de Lorraine. This gave Bodiansky the opportunity to work closely with Lods again. The two of them, along with Beaudouin and metal fabricator Jean Prouvé, designed a market with both a ground and upper floor. The latter could be used as a 1000-seat auditorium or transformed into a cinema. This building came to be known as the Maison du Peuple. Both the floor and the roof were retractable. This innovative project helped Bodiansky solidify himself as both an engineer and an architect, as his design made the market more versatile (by providing both food and entertainment). The Maison du Peuple is now known as one of the biggest open air markets in France.

== ATBAT ==
Bodiansky met Le Corbusier during the Second World War, and together they organized a team of architects and engineers to engage in the postwar reconstruction. This led to the formation of the Atelier des Bâtisseurs (ATBAT, builders' workshop), an interdisciplinary research group, in 1945. After the war, Bodiansky accompanied Le Corbusier on a trip to the United States, where he was impressed with the interdisciplinary approach of the TVA projects. On their return to France, Bodiansky took the leadership of ATBAT and reorganized it as a collaborative research center. Over the next few years, Bodiansky as head of ATBAT collaborated with Le Corbusier on the realization of some of his best-known buildings, including the Unité d'habitation in Marseille and the Headquarters of the United Nations in New York.

== North African housing problem ==
In the late 1940s, Bodiansky oversaw the construction of houses in Morocco, an area that had been plagued with too much internal migration from nearby rural areas, leading to a shortage of houses. Bodiansky, acting on behalf of Le Corbusier, teamed up with young architects such as Georges Candilis, Shadrach Woods, and Henri Pilot, and created ATBAT-Afrique, a firm designed to fix the housing problems throughout Northern Africa. The goal of the firm was to efficiently construct projects and bring engineers and architects closer together as well as strengthen and contribute to the reconstruction effort following World War II. Bodiansky's team was able to come up with quick and innovative housing solutions, and solved the housing problem within two years.

== Death ==
Bodiansky died on December 10, 1966, in Paris, France.

== See also ==
- Michel Écochard
