= Weisgerber =

Weisgerber is a German surname. Notable people with the surname include:

- Albert Weisgerber (1878–1915), German painter
- Anja Weisgerber, German politician from Bavaria
- Antje Weisgerber, German actress
- Dick Weisgerber, American football player
- Frédéric Weisgerber, French doctor and cartographer in Morocco
- Gerd Weisgerber, German mining archaeologist
- Jack Weisgerber, Canadian politician and businessman
- James Weisgerber, Canadian Catholic Archbishop
- Leo Weisgerber, German linguist
