= Grand Lycée Franco-Libanais =

Private Franco-Lebanese school in Beirut, Lebanon

Grand Lycée Franco-Libanais de Beyrouth
- Mission Laïque Française

Location
- Rue Beni Assaf, Achrafieh; Beirut; Lebanon
- Coordinates: 33.8824229°N 35.515823299999965°E

Information
- Type: Private school
- Established: 1909
- Founder: Mission laïque française
- Principal: Xavier Ferrand
- Faculty: 180
- Grades: 1–12
- Enrollment: 5,000
- Athletics: Swimming, ultimate, football, basketball, tennis, handball, ping-pong, gymnastics, acrogym, squash, volleyball, athletics, badminton
- Affiliations: Mission laïque française
- Languages: French, Latin, Arabic, English, Spanish, German, Italian
- Website: http://www.glfl.edu.lb

The Grand Lycée Franco-Libanais (GLFL) is a French lycée in the Achrafieh district of Beirut, founded in 1909 by the Mission laïque française. It is recognised as a French international school by the Agency for French Education Abroad (AEFE).

== History ==
The school buildings in Achrafieh, Beirut, designed by Michel Ecochard in 1961.

The Lebanese civil war, which began in 1975, marks the most serious crisis the Grand Lycée ever faced. The buildings were badly damaged and due to their proximity to the Green Line, access was difficult. From 1996 to 2003, the lycée undertook renovations, where all the "Ecochard" buildings were rehabilitated and new structures were constructed. The stadium "Stade du Chayla" was inaugurated on 25 March 2005 and renovated in 2018.

Initially located in the Sodeco neighborhood near the central Beirut district, it later moved to Beni Assaf Street, near the French embassy and Saint Joseph University in the Badaro neighborhood. GLFL has ten buildings, five of which were conceived by the French planner Michel Ecochard, and also added an athletic stadium on Damascus street: "Le stade de Chayla".

== Organisation ==
The school offers classes to more than 3,600 students. School departments include 3 libraries in which students can find a network of computers, as well as 27,000 books and literary archives. A secondary library known as the BCD is also available to younger students. Across the street, the Stade du Chayla comprises a track-and-field playground, along with tennis, badminton, basketball and mini-soccer courts.

== Notable alumni ==
- Amir-Abbas Hoveyda (1919-1979), Prime Minister of Iran
- Marwan Hamadeh, Minister of Telecommunications, Economy, Trade and Health
- Gebran Tueni, Editor-in-chief of An-Nahar and Member of Parliament
- Fares Souhaid, General Secretary of the March 14 Coalition and Member of Parliament
- Samir Kassir, journalist
- Nassim Nicholas Taleb, author of The Black Swan
- Nabil Bukhalid, Former Chief Enterprise Architect at American University of Beirut

== See also ==
- Education in the Ottoman Empire
