= Mourad Ben Embarek =

Moroccan modernist architect

Mourad Ben Embarek (Arabic: مراد بن مبارك; died 2011) was a Moroccan modernist architect. He was a leader in the reconstruction of Agadir and published the first post-independence architecture magazine in Morocco: a+u.

== Life ==
Mourad Ben Embarek was a member of Groupe des Architectes Modernes Marocains (GAMMA).

In 1961, he took over for Abdeslam Faraoui and directed the Service of Urbanism, remaining as director until 1966.

== Notable works ==
- Technopark, Casablanca
- Terminal 1 of Mohammed V International Airport, Casablanca
- Atlas Tower, Casablanca
