= Salut Casa! =

1952 film by Jean Vidal

Salut Casa! (or Casablanca Boom Town for English audiences) is a 1952 pseudo-documentary propaganda short film about Casablanca under the French Protectorate. Directed by Jean Vidal, it was screened at the 1953 Cannes Film Festival. The film presents Casablanca to French audiences as a miracle of the French mission civilatrice, a modern city in North Africa with high-rise buildings and wide avenues, a bustling economy and rapid development and masterful French planning and administration. The French urbanist Michel Écochard, the director of the Service de l'Urbanisme, Casablanca's urban planning office at the time, featured prominently in the film and discussed how challenges such as internal migration and rapid urbanization were being handled in Casablanca.

The film was dubbed into English and Spanish.
