= MAMMA. =

MAMMA. Modernist Architects of Morocco Memorial Association
- Arabic: ذاكرة المهندسين المعماريين الحداثيين المغاربة; French: Mémoire des architectes modernes marocains
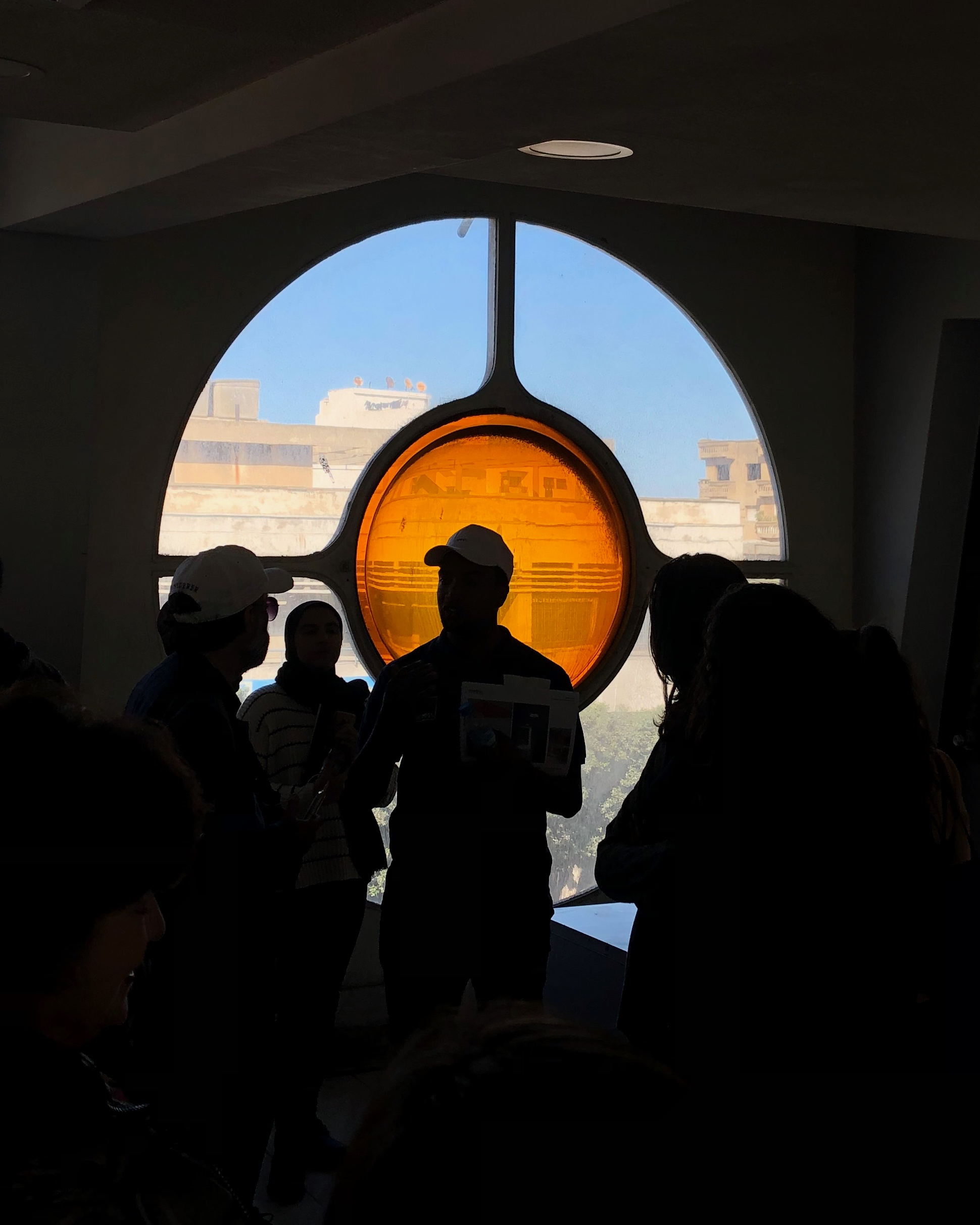
- A MAMMA.-led tour of Jean-François Zevaco's Vincent Timsit Workshop in Roches Noires, Casablanca November 2019.
- Founders: Imad Dahmani; Lahbib el-Moumni
- Location: Casablanca, Morocco

The Modernist Architects of Morocco Memorial Association (Arabic: ذاكرة المهندسين المعماريين الحداثيين المغاربة, French: Mémoire des architectes modernes marocains), or MAMMA., is an architectural heritage association based in Casablanca, Morocco. It's dedicated to the preservation of modernist and post-independence architectural heritage.

== Activities ==
=== Modern Casablanca Map ===
In 2019, MAMMA., realized the Modern Casablanca Map project in collaboration with the Observatory Workshop (Collective Museum). The project consisted of creating a map and guidebook to Casablanca's modernist and post-independence architecture, as well as hosting guided tours and a temporary exhibition at the cupola of the Arab League Park.

=== Elie Azagury ===
On December 20, 2019, MAMMA. sponsored an event dedicated to the architectural legacy of Elie Azagury, the first Moroccan modernist architect. This event included guided tours of the Ibrahim Roudani School and a lecture hosted by the Saudi Library.
