= Tcharmil =

Tcharmil (sometimes Tcharmile or mesharmil in French or Spanish) is an expression in Moroccan dialect traditionally indicating a range of marinaded spicy food flavours for meat dishes which includes garlic, olive oil and parsley (see: Chermoula). It is also a kind of youth subculture, which has gained momentum in recent years among disaffected Moroccan youth.

More recently the name has been adopted by gangs of youths from the slums of the country.

Their Modus operandi is to spread extreme fear by placing video images of its members commuting crimes of extreme violence on social media. Most criminals who commit Tcharmil tend to be violent, and usually stab or leave scar wounds on their victim's face despite receiving what they were after (Mobile phones, wallet, etc...). Tcharmil display distinctive hair-styles and seek to emulate the organized Hispanic street gangs of the United States of America such as the Latin Kings. Their preferred weapons are meat cleavers and butchers knives.

The first attack occurred in a fashionable hair salon in the district of Maârif in Casablanca during March 2014. Three male youths entered and wreaked havoc by wielding machetes. Clients fled in terror. A copycat crime wave ensued occasioning serious assaults occasioning actual bodily harm and violent deaths.

Tcharmil although begun in Casablanca, it quickly spread to Fes, Meknes, Agadir, Rabat, Temara Marrakesh and is appearing in other Moroccan cities.

To combat this phenomenon, King Mohammed VI of Morocco on 7 April 2014 launched a major national police campaign resulting in multiple arrests.

The number of recent attacks has been in the rise throughout the Moroccan cities; This is mainly due to the lack of police force in poor neighborhoods and lack of severe law sentences. Most "mcharmline" (perpetrators), usually receive light jail sentences varying between six months to one year in jail if they are caught, allowing them to gain more confidence to commit even more violent crimes upon exiting prison.
