= Team 10 =

Architectural group founded in 1953

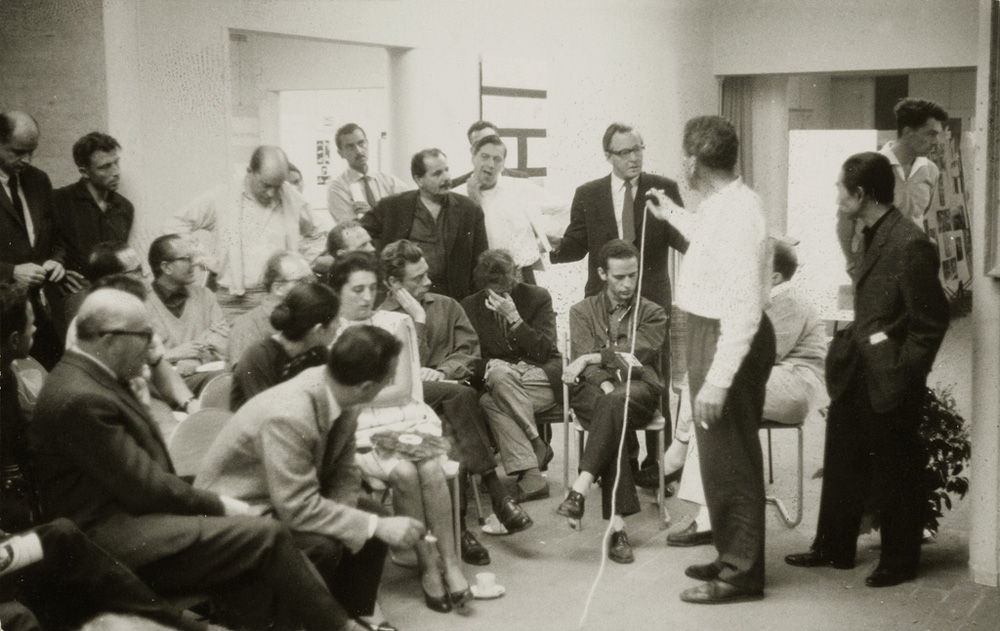
Otterlo Meeting 1959 (also CIAM '59), organized by Team 10, 43 participants. Meeting place: Kröller-Müller Museum, located in the Hoge Veluwe National Park. Dissolution of the organization CIAM.

Team 10 – just as often referred to as Team X or Team Ten – was a group of architects and other invited participants who assembled starting in July 1953 at the 9th Congress of the International Congresses of Modern Architecture (CIAM) and created a schism within CIAM by challenging its doctrinaire approach to urbanism.

== Membership ==
The group's first formal meeting under the name of Team 10 took place in Bagnols-sur-Cèze in 1960. The last, with only four members present, was in Lisbon in 1981.

Team 10 had a fluid membership, yet a core group actively organized the various meetings, which consisted of Alison and Peter Smithson, Jaap Bakema, Aldo van Eyck, Georges Candilis, Shadrach Woods, and Giancarlo De Carlo. Other members included Ralph Erskine, Daniel van Ginkel, Blanche Lemco Van Ginkel, Pancho Guedes, Geir Grung, Oskar Hansen, Reima Pietilä, Charles Polonyi, Brian Richards, Jerzy Sołtan, Oswald Mathias Ungers, John Voelcker, and Stefan Wewerka.

They referred to themselves as "a small family group of architects who have sought each other out because each has found the help of the others necessary to the development and understanding of their own individual work." Team 10's theoretical framework, disseminated primarily through teaching and publications, had a profound influence on the development of architectural thought in the second half of the 20th century, primarily in Europe and the United States.

Two different movements were associated with Team 10: the New Brutalism of the British members (Alison and Peter Smithson) and the Structuralism of the Dutch members (Aldo van Eyck and Jaap Bakema).

== History ==
Team 10's core group started meeting within the context of CIAM, the international platform for modern architects founded in 1928. Their views often opposed the philosophies put forward by CIAM, and following founder Le Corbusier's exit in 1955, CIAM dissolved in 1959 to give way to Team 10 as the centralized, authoritative think tank concerning Brutalism, Structuralism, and related urban planning.

When Jaap Bakema, one of Team 10's core members, died in 1981, the other members used this as an occasion to end their collaboration as Team 10.
