= Verticalization =

Increase in the number of high-rise buildings in an area

Verticalization is a phenomenon, typically seen in major cities, where there is a general increase in the population of high-rise residential buildings. As of 2024, there is no agreed-upon definition of verticalization.

Across multiple research papers, verticalization or "vertical gentrification" has been linked with the densification and super-gentrification of urban areas since it generally occurs in neighborhoods that were undergoing gentrification or had been previously gentrified. Densification refers to increasing the population through jobs or housing; super-gentrification refers to the redevelopment of previously gentrified neighborhoods.

High-rise residential buildings and luxury apartments are main contributors to the verticalization of urban areas. The verticalization of neighborhoods with luxury buildings attracts dwellers who rent by choice, not necessity—labeled as "discretionary" renters by Yardi Matrix.

One research paper from 2020 that investigated the effects of COVID-19 on luxury markets defined luxury real estate in Boston as $4.50 per square foot or higher in rent or properties that sell for $1,200 per square foot or higher. John Lauermann defines luxury housing as a property that reaches the minimum threshold for the "mansion tax" in his research into vertical gentrification in New York City.

The effects of verticalization are similar to those of gentrification, including increased neighborhood economic value, residential demographic change, and displacement of current residents.

== History ==
=== Term Origin ===
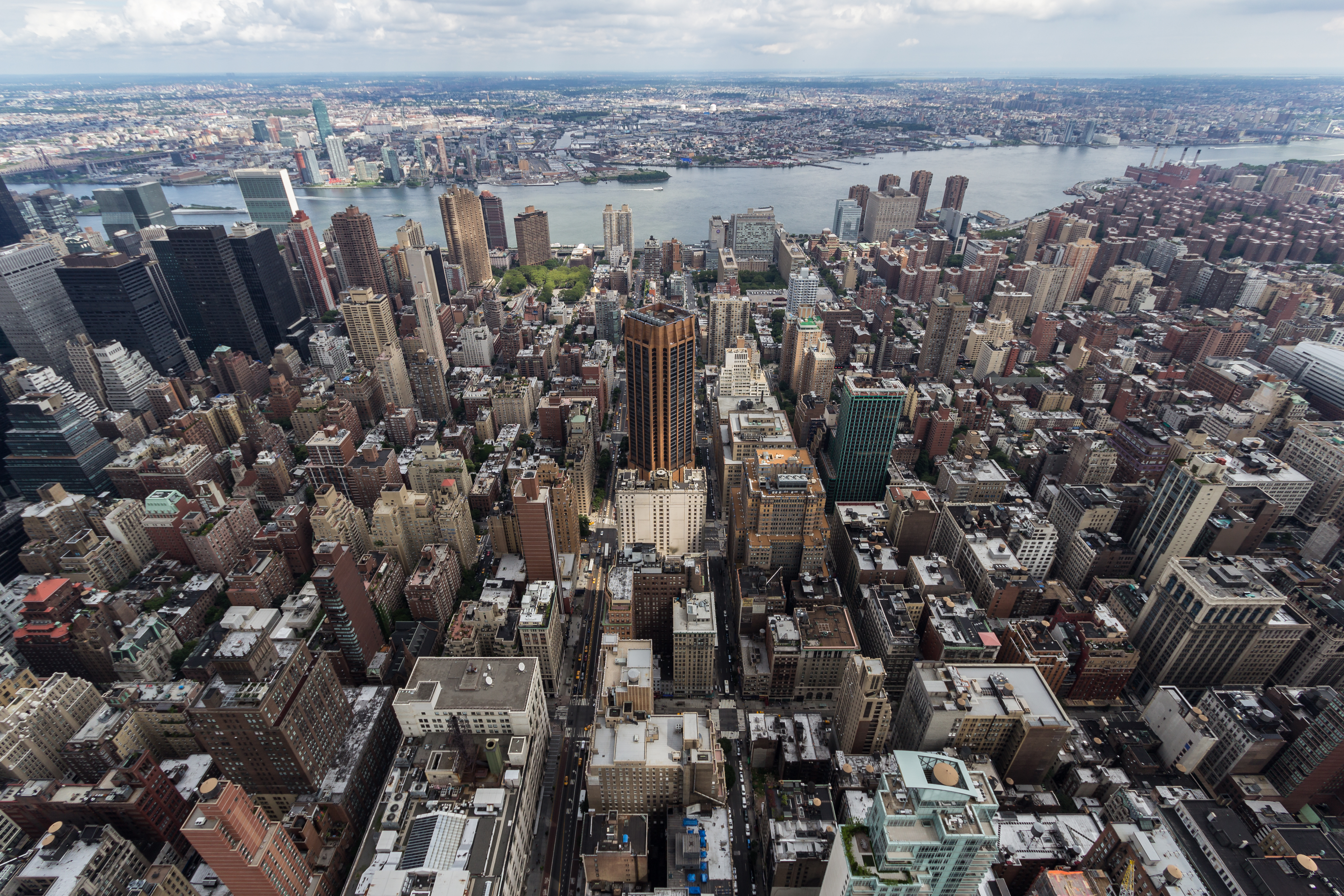
Iconic vertical cityscape of New York City

The term "vertical" comes from the late Latin word "verticalis", meaning "overhead", and the Latin "vertex", meaning "highest point". Verticalization is used interchangeably with Manhattanization, vertical urbanization or urbanism, and vertical gentrification in many research studies.

One of the main considerations of a potential buyer is where the building is located. If you think of location in three dimensions, the street the building is located on is the two-dimensional coordinate and the height is the third dimension. The floor that a high-rise unit is located on can be far enough away from the busy streets that the building location does not play a role. Verticalization takes advantage of the three-dimensional space on the same two-dimensional plot of land.

=== High-Rise Buildings ===
High-rise luxury buildings predate World War II when they were designed to facilitate the transition away from a servant-dependent society and provide mass public housing. High-rise buildings acted as an economically logical solution in urban areas that maximized the number of units within a building complex once it surpassed seven stories; since the developer already invested in the requirements for a high-rise building, the costs would be divided across more units, which could lower the cost per unit and create more affordable housing.

Since the mid-1990s, the number of high-rise buildings over 150 meters in cities around the world has drastically increased from 20 being built in 1992 to 331 in 2019. The process of verticalization is also related to consumer culture and symbols of power.

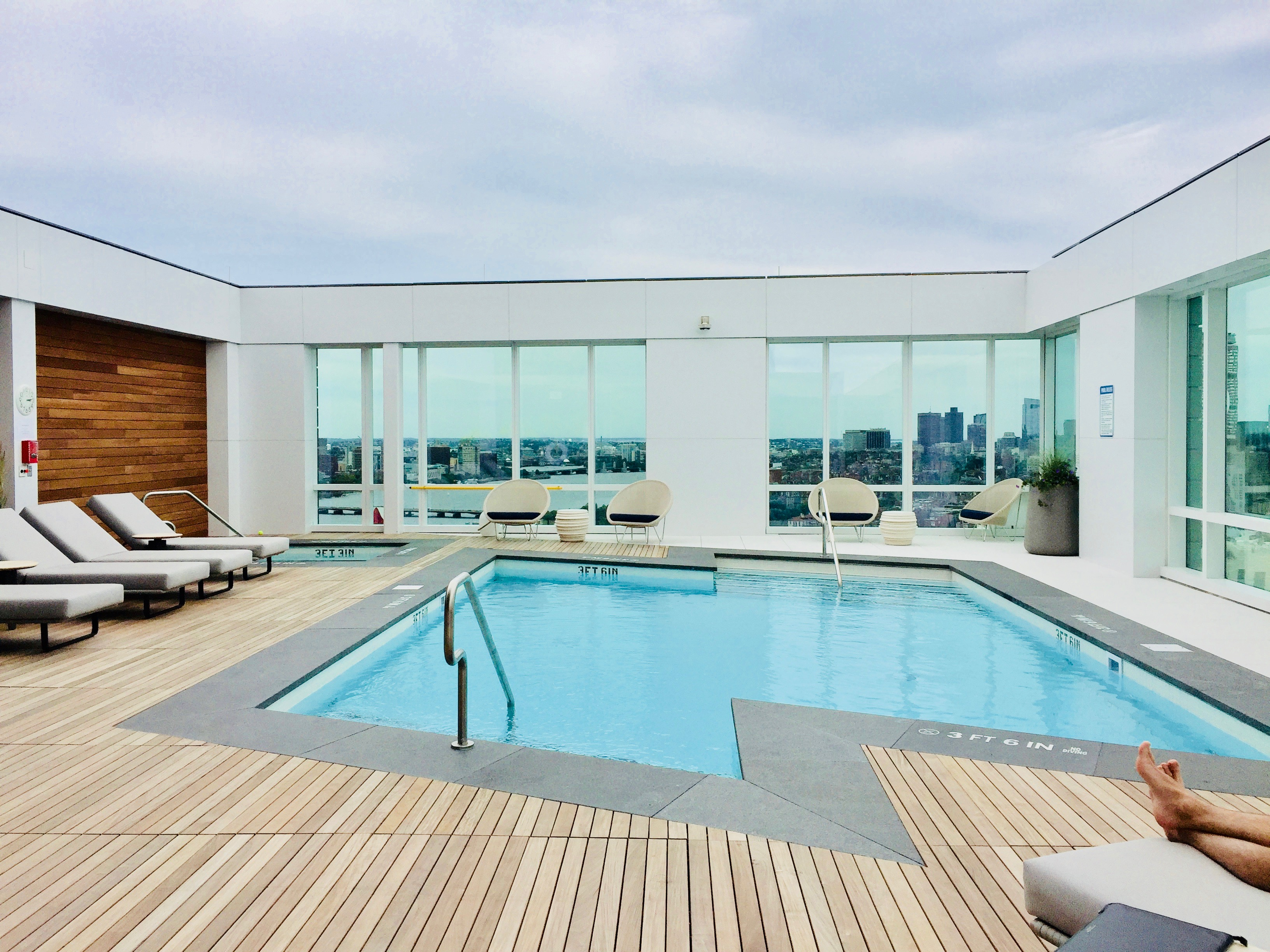
Roof-top pool at the 30 story Pierce Boston

High-rises can provide more amenities, such as gyms, pools, outdoor lounge spaces, parking, retail spaces, and more. As of 2020, a renter preferences survey performed by the National Multifamily Housing Council and Kingsley Associates consulting firm showed that 44% of residents consider amenities an important factor when choosing where to live. Other building features such as increased security, improved air quality, improved accessibility, and a more desirable location, although not considered amenities, do increase a high-rise's marketability.

As the list of benefits to high-rise living increases, the price of each unit begins to attract a more affluent social class. There is a gray area between what people consider high-rise buildings and luxury high-rise buildings, implying that a large number of high-rise buildings are intentionally constructed as luxury housing.

Between the 1930s and 1970s, modernists believed that physically raising lower social classes into higher buildings would improve their morale, social norms, and monetary status; they also thought it would protect urban residents from gas attacks and bombings. Though the latter statement is not a main motivation for high-rise construction anymore, the social class effects are still prevalent today.

== Causes ==
=== Elite class ===
Real estate acts as a common investment opportunity for the elite class. As more luxury high-rise buildings are developed in densely populated and heavily sought after areas, more members of the elite class are interested in buying. The distribution of housing started to skew as developers built for the rich rather than the general public.

High-rise buildings transitioned from a solution to affordable housing to luxury condominiums. Because some cities relied on the capital investments of these high-rises, the goal of providing more affordable housing was overlooked.

Along with this intensification of neighborhoods followed increasing social class gaps. As years passed, the elite class continued to gravitate toward high-rise buildings, which provided height above surrounding low-rise properties coincidentally representative of the gap in social class; the exclusivity of these units perpetuated a more private, prestigious, and powerful lifestyle.

One research paper examines the theoretical relationship between power and height through the lens of vertical urbanization, showing how vertical height was inversely proportional to wealth in the late 18th to early 19th centuries.

The features unique to a luxury high-rise building, such as exclusive panoramic views, became increasingly synonymous with wealthy inhabitants until they were rarely attainable to middle and lower social classes. While this proves true for many American cities, an exception to the rule is how the Housing and Development Board (HDB) in Indonesia has employed high-rise buildings to provide affordable housing and sustainable solutions.

=== COVID ===
After the COVID-19 pandemic, the kinds of amenities desired in a living space changed to be more hygiene-oriented and all-encompassing. According to Dubuque, the Amenity Wars were paused during the brunt of the pandemic; the Amenity Wars represent the battle within the available housing market over what amenities a building provides and how they align with specific lifestyles. However, since the end of the pandemic, buyers and renters moved back from the suburbs and rural areas to cities and commuter towns.

Though many of these luxury high-rise buildings are being intentionally constructed to improve their residents' lifestyles post-coronavirus, the poor construction and close quarters pose a health risk.

One of the risks involved with living in a high-rise includes an increase in viral transmission through the sewage system and shared spaces like stairs and elevators. Poor construction consequences such as leaks, failing equipment, and maintenance negligence in common spaces make the amenities associated with high-rises out of service.

== Examples of Verticalization in the U.S. ==
=== Boston ===
In 2018, 12 of the highest-priced luxury condominiums were 50 times more expensive than Boston's median household income. Over half of these condos' owners do not apply for residential exemption, meaning this is not their primary residence. Between 2020 and 2022, 89% of the new units built in Boston were luxury apartments.

Some housing advocates believe that building more housing for the elite class will create a trickle-down effect that vacates existing units for lower-income groups. Other housing activists believe that developing more mixed-income housing will provide more affordable housing while avoiding new luxury real estate's tendency to increase land values.

Roxbury Crossing saw a 70% increase in its housing prices between 2010 and 2015. Some developers offer to reserve units at discounted rates for residents who were requested to move, but these are still too high.

However, there have been efforts from the City of Boston to combat gentrification in Boston neighborhoods; in 2022, Mayor Wu created the Rent Stabilization Advisory Committee and allocated $40 million in funding toward 700 income-restricted units. Additionally, the Inclusionary Development Policy (IDP) requires that market-rate housing support the income-restricted housing market by dedicating a portion of their building as affordable housing, creating affordable housing near their building, or contributing to the IDP fund.
