= Frédéric Weisgerber =

French geographer and physician (1868–1946)

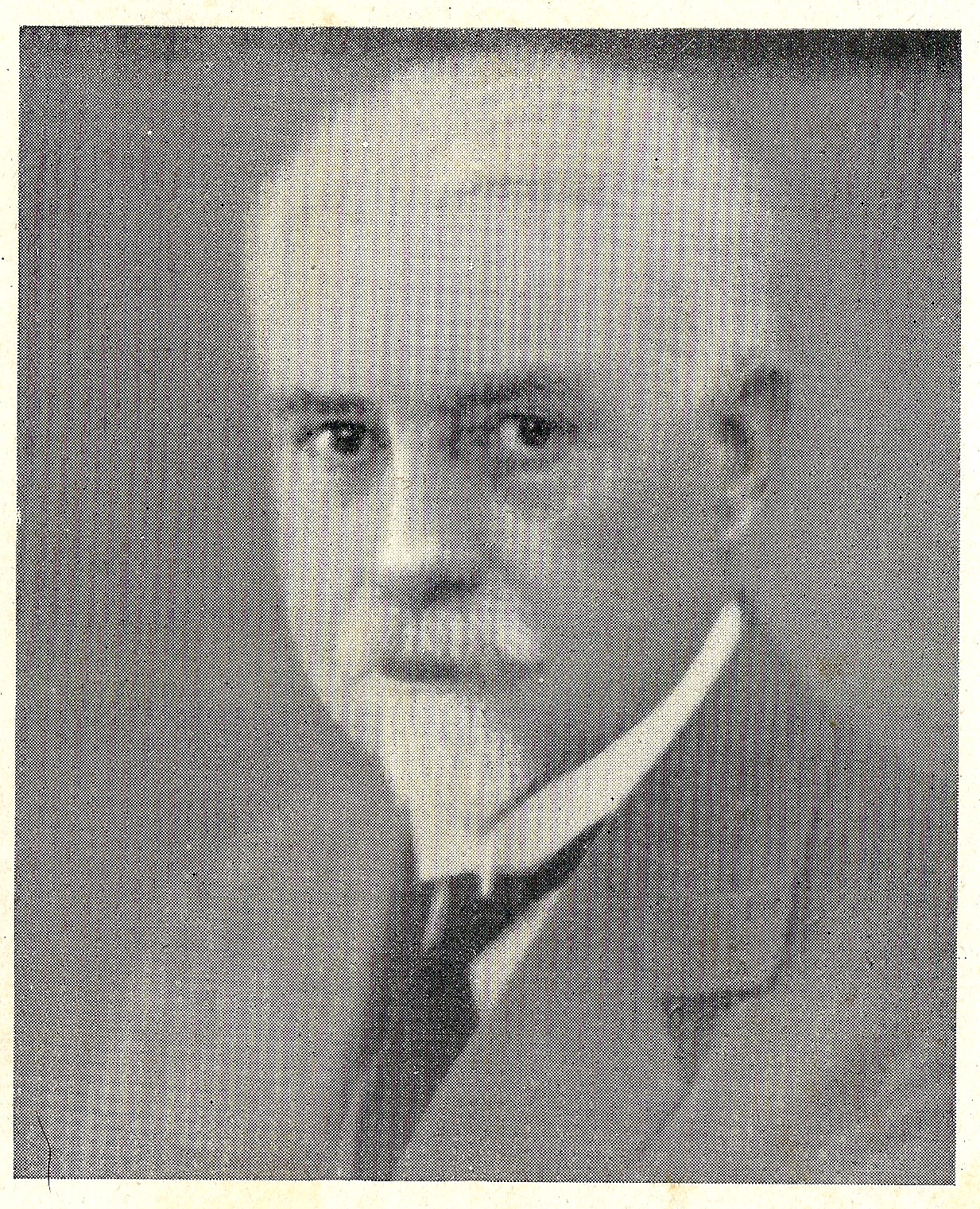

Frédéric Weisgerber (30 March 1868, - 26 December 1946, Rabat) was a French colonial doctor and cartographer active in Morocco before and during the French Protectorate. In 1904, he wrote a book entitled Trois mois de campagne au Maroc: étude géographique de la région parcourue about his three-month participation in a campaign in Morocco in the winter of 1898.

== Biography ==
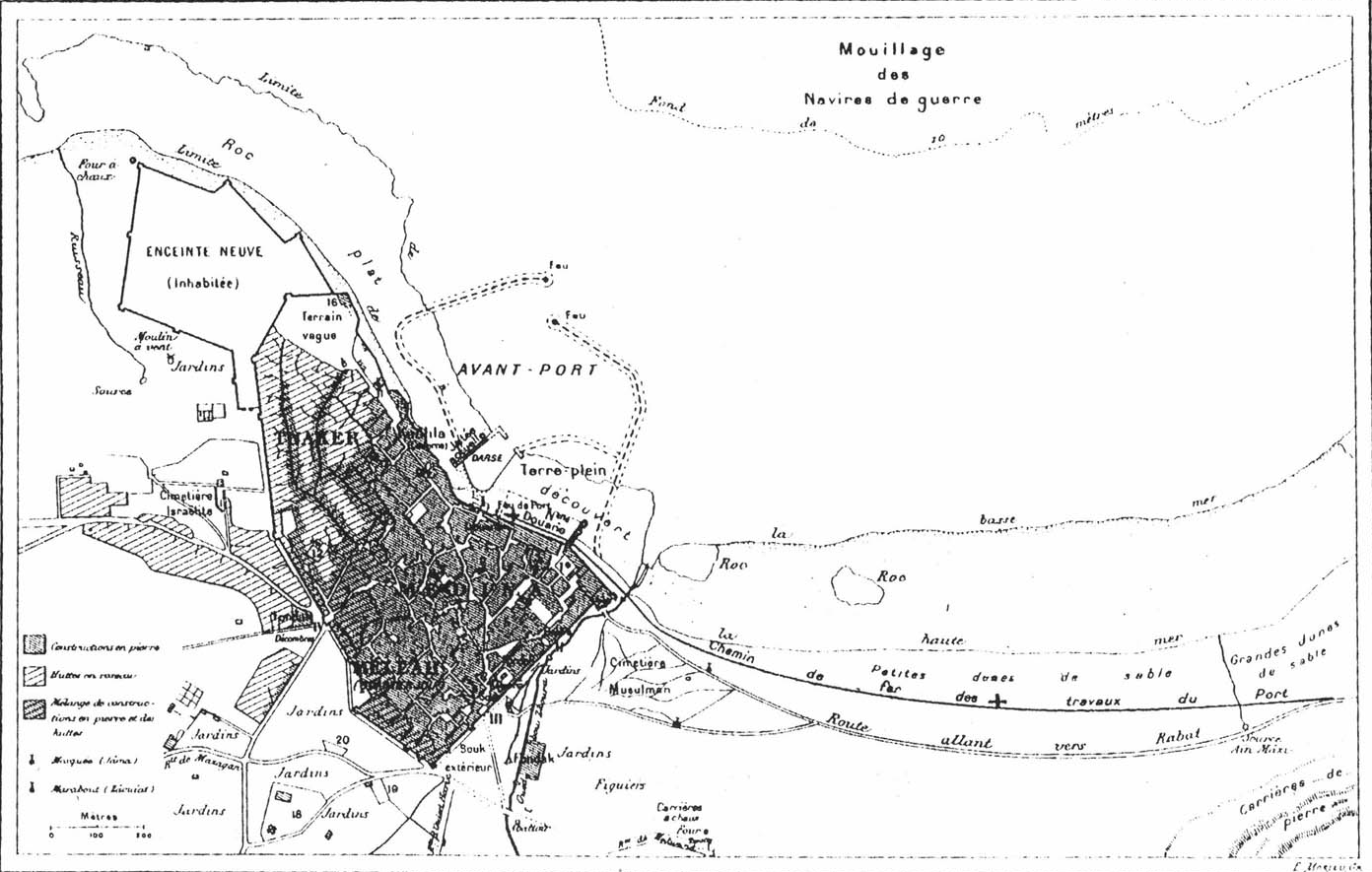
Plan of Casablanca in 1907, the year the French bombed the city, as prepared by Frédéric Weisgerber. Published in the 10 August 1907 issue of L'Illustration.

He was born to a military family in Sainte-Marie-aux-Mines, Haut-Rhin in 1868.

== Trois Mois de Campagne au Maroc ==
His 1904 book Trois Mois de Campagne au Maroc recounts his 3-month journey through Morocco occasioned by the illness of Sultan Abdelaziz's grand vizier, Ahmed bin Mūsa ash-Sharqī, commonly known as Ba Ahmed, early 1898.

In this book, Weisgerber describes the geography of what had been a "terra incognita" to Europeans: its "orography, hydrography, geology, climate, flora, fauna, and population." He also illustrates the contrast between Bled el-Makhzen, where the sultan has direct authority, and Bled es-Siba, inhabited by independent tribes. The book also discusses the ongoing insurrection of Jilali ben Driss al-Youssefi al-Zerhouni, commonly known as El Rogui or Bou Hmara, in the north, as well as the Makhzen's treatment of prisoners at the time.

== Publications ==
- Organisation médicale en Allemagne, thèse de la Faculté de Médecine de Paris, H. Jouve, 1894, 59 p.
- Trois mois de campagne au Maroc : étude géographique de la région parcourue, Paris : Ernest Leroux, 1904, 260 p.
- Le Malais vulgaire, vocabulaire et éléments de grammaire à l'usage des voyageurs en Malaisie, Paris : E. Leroux, 1908, 64 p.
- Carte provisoire de la région de Fez, levée et dressée par le Dr F. Weisgerber, Paris : H. Barrère, 1912
- Le Maroc il y a 30 ans, conférence faite aux officiers et aux contrôleurs civils stagiaires du Cours préparatoire au Service des Affaires Indigènes du Maroc, le 4 avril 1928, Impr. réunies de la Vigie marocaine et du Petit marocain, 1928, 39 p.
- Casablanca et les Châouïa en 1900, préface du général Albert-Gérard-Léon d'Amade (1856-1941), Casablanca : sur les presses des Imprimeries réunies de la «Vigie marocaine» et du « Petit Marocain », 1935, 139 p., fig., avec un plan de Casablanca et une carte des Châouïa, des reproductions d'aquarelles de E. W. Soudan et de photographies de l'auteur et de G. L. Tricot.
- Au seuil du Maroc moderne, Rabat : les Éditions la Porte, 1947, 368-IV p. il s'agit d'un réaménagement de Casablanca et les Châouïa en 1900, complété de 4 pages de lexique
