= Carrières Centrales =

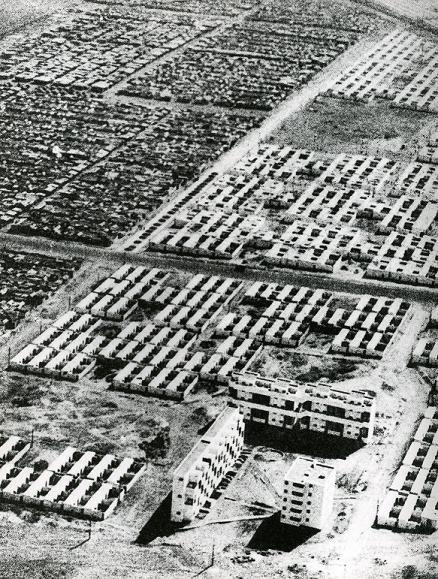
- Interactive map of the Carrières Centrales area

General information
- Location: Hay Mohammadi Casablanca Morocco
- Coordinates: 33.583°N 7.564°W
- Completed: 1952

Carrières Centrales (Moroccan Arabic: كريان سنطرال) is a series of modernist housing developments in Casablanca, Morocco designed in the 1950s by architects Georges Candillis, Shadrach Woods, Alexis Josic. The development aimed to create utopian "habitats" that would provide alternatives to slum life for working class residents of the city. Carrières Centrales has been noted as a prominent example of modernism within the Maghreb.

== History ==
Michel Écochard was appointed Director of the Service de l’Urbanisme et de l’Architecture of French Morocco in 1946. Following a multidisciplinary study of the nation's housing needs, Écochard established a plan to develop a number of housing projects for the working poor at the outskirts of Morocco's major cities. Écochard conceived of a substantial program that included a specially designed 8 x 8 meter grid plan.

Carrières Centrales, a site in the Hay Mohammadi district of Casablanca, was the first project to test Écochard's design. The development aimed to provide affordable housing for individuals working in a nearby factory and French homes.

In 1952, Georges Candilis, Shadrach Woods, and Alexis Josic—the architects Écochard assigned to the project—designed a series of utopian modernist modular complexes for the site that additional educational, administrative, and religious facilities. Influenced by Le Corbusier's Unité d'habitation and the communal nature of slum life, the resulting mid-rise complexes featured highly collective multilevel living exemplified by myriad balconies. The site's buildings became known by the residents as Semiramis and Nid D'Abeille as references to their visual similarities to honeycombs and the Hanging Gardens of Babylon respectively.

Since their construction, many of the complex's residents have modified the buildings significantly, most frequently by walling off the original balconies.
