= Hay Mohammadi =

Hay Mohammadi الحي المحمدي
- Arrondissement of Casablanca
- Interactive map of Hay Mohammadi
- Coordinates: 33°35′02″N 7°33′22″W
- Country: Morocco
- Region: Casablanca-Settat
- Prefecture: Casablanca

Population (2004)
  - Total: 156,501
- Time zone: UTC+0 (GMT)

Hay Mohammadi or Hay Mohammedi (Arabic: الحي المحمدي) is a neighbourhood in eastern Casablanca, in the Aïn Sebaâ - Hay Mohammadi district of the Casablanca-Settat region of Morocco. As of 2004 it had 156,501 inhabitants.

The district was once home to North Africa's oldest and largest slum, formerly known as Carrières Centrales, which was largely demolished throughout the 2010s within the framework of the Moroccan government's 'Cities without Slums' (French: Villes sans bidonvilles; Arabic: مدن بلا صفيح). The project has been criticized for its forced relocation into unsustainable debts and relocating city dwellers away from their work and social sphere. Celebrated as a laboratory for industrial and housing innovation during the colonial period, but also famous for playing a crucial role in the anticolonial struggle, according to Strava, C. (2021).

This neighbourhood has been historically referred to as a 'mythical place', and locals talk about it with pride and affection.

The people in Hay Mohammadi face various challenges, including social degradation, economic insecurity, and struggles for material well-being. These issues are exacerbated by urban transformations, historical legacies, and neoliberal reforms that impact their everyday lives. Additionally, residents grapple with inadequate housing conditions, limited access to resources, and the reproduction of social inequalities within the neighborhood.

== History ==
During the colonial era, the neighbourhood became a space for industrial and housing innovation. It was also famous for playing a crucial role in the anti-colonial struggle. In 1952, protests against the assassination of popular Tunisian labour leader Farhat Hached by French extremists were violently suppressed. Hundreds were killed by French troops.

After the colonial period, during the reign of Hassan II of Morocco, the neighbourhood was the scene of protests and contestations of the monarch's power. As a response, the neighbourhood saw violent repression and the creation of an underground detention centre. As such, human rights abuses and violent state power were common during this period.

During the 1980s, the neighbourhood saw a period of economic decline, as the removal of food subsidies and trade reforms led to massive job losses in the area.

The 2003 and 2007 suicide attacks in Casablanca shined light on the circumstances in slums such as Hay Mohammadi, where the attackers predominantly originated from. This resulted into relocation policies in the 2010s of the 'cities without slums' project where many of the former inhabitants of Hay Mohammadi were resettled to Lahraouiyine, 10 kilometers outside of Casablanca's boundaries.

== Transport ==
Since 2019, the neighbourhood is served by lines T1 and T2 the Casablanca Tramway. Hay Mohammadi offers a privileged entry point into how colonial and post-colonial ideas, images and projects promoting the logics of twentiethcentury 'modernity' have fuelled profound – and profoundly unequal – social transformations, and continue to feed into new social realities. Strava, C. (2021). Precarious modernities : assembling state, space and society on the urban margins in Morocco (First edition.). Zed Books. https://doi.org/10.5040/9781350232570

== Population ==
The population of Hay Mohammedi consist by almost two-thirds of people between the ages of fifteen and twenty-nine. This causes tension and issues within society. A large number of these youth are unemployed and experience social and financial challenges on a daily basis. The male youth of Hay Mohammadi in the aftermath of street raids in 2014 was heavily targeted as criminals, 'Tcharmil'. In the course of these events, many NGOs were founded with the aim of supporting this group.

=== Jam'iyya ===
Jam'iyya is an association that was established in 2003 in Hay Mohammadi with the aim to create a space for youth (teenagers and young adults) from lower socioeconomic backgrounds, often due to the high unemployment and social stigmatization. The goal was for the youth to be able to express themselves, their experienced dissent and their struggles, often in an artistic manner. Additionally, there were (after-school) tutoring programmes. Thus, Jam'iyya provided a safer place to socialize, further developing skills, and process lived experiences; a local activist response to national and international governance.

== Notable residents ==
- Larbi Batma – singer
- Dounia Batma
- Hasnaa Bouhadda
- Jalal Jayed – FIFA referee
- Salma Rachid
- Nass El Ghiwane

== See also ==
- Aïn Sebaâ - Hay Mohammadi
- Carrières Centrales
- Casablanca
- Casablanca-Settat
- Derb Moulay Cherif
