= Shadrach Woods =

American architect (1923–1973)

Shadrach Woods (June 30, 1923 – July 31, 1973) was an American architect, urban planner and theorist.

== Biography ==
Schooled in engineering at New York University and in literature and philosophy at Trinity College, Dublin, Woods joined the Paris office of Le Corbusier in 1948. Assigned to the project for the Unité d'Habitation, then under construction in Marseille, France, Woods met the Azerbaijan-born Greek architect George Candilis, with whom he would later form a lasting partnership.

With Candilis and the engineer Vladimir Bodiansky, Woods designed and built housing throughout North Africa during his tenure as head of the Casablanca office of ATBAT-Afrique (Atelier des Bâtisseurs). Ideas developed during the course of this work led to a winning proposal for Opération Million, a public housing competition in France, in 1954. Commissioned by the welfare state to design thousands of suburban housing units, Woods and Candilis joined with the Yugoslavian architect Alexis Josic to create in 1956 the firm Candilis-Josic-Woods.

Among the firm's major built projects were the extension of the village of Bagnols-sur-Cèze and the development of the quarter of Le Mirail in Toulouse in France and, with Manfred Schieldhelm, the Free University in Berlin. Simultaneously, Candilis and Woods participated in the proceedings of Team X, a group of architects that emerged from the meetings of CIAM in the postwar years. Woods is perhaps best known as a thinker and writer. He published numerous essays on urban themes, including explanations of his concepts of "stem" and "web", and participated in the 1968 Milan Triennale at the invitation of the Italian architect and fellow Team X member Giancarlo de Carlo.

After the breakup of the firm in 1969, Woods returned to New York City. He taught at Harvard and Yale universities and lectured widely. Until his untimely death in 1973, he continued to work as an architect and urban planner on such projects as the Lower Manhattan Expressway and the renovation of the SoHo neighborhood. His book The Man in the Street: A Polemic on Urbanism was published posthumously by Penguin in 1975. Woods' architectural drawings and papers are now held by the Drawings and Archives Department of Avery Architectural and Fine Arts Library at Columbia University.

== See also ==
- Team X
- Georges Candilis
- Alexis Josic

== Bibliography ==
- Jürgen Joedicke, Candilis, Josic, Woods, une décennie d'architecture et d'urbanisme, éd. Eyrolles, 1968, 224 p.
- Tom Avermaete, Another Modern: The Post-war Architecture and Urbanism of Candilis-Josic-Woods, Rotterdam, Nai, 2005.
- Karl Kiem, Die Freie Universität Berlin (1967-73). Hochschulbau, Team-X-ideale und tektonische Phantasie/The Free University Berlin (1967-73) Campus design, Team X ideals and tectonic invention, Weimar, VDG, 2008.
