= Georges Candilis =

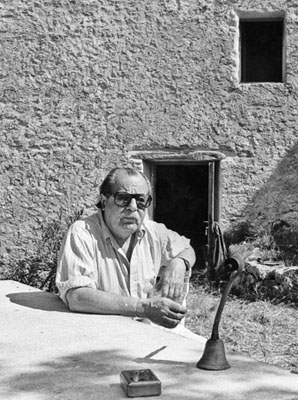
- Born: April 11, 1913; Baku, Baku Governorate, Russian Empire
- Died: May 10, 1995 (aged 82); Paris, France
- Education: National Technical University of Athens
- Occupation: Architect
- Projects: Le Mirail

Georges Candilis (Greek: Γεώργιος Κανδύλης; 11 April [O.S. 29 March] 1913 – 10 May 1995) was a Greek-French architect and urbanist.

== Biography ==
Born in Azerbaijan, he moved to Greece and graduated from the Polytechnic School of Athens between 1931 and 1936. In 1933 he met Le Corbusier during his studies, at CIAM IV, as a result he is assigned the direction of ASCORAL in 1943. In 1945, he moved to France in along with many other Greek intellectuals escaping the White Terror aboard the Mataroa voyage. There he worked for André Lurçat and Le Corbusier in their office, and was involved in the construction of the Unité d'Habitation de Marseille. Together with Shadrach Woods and Henri Piot, he was engaged in the search for solutions in the problem of the rapidly urbanizing science of Islamic countries, combining low-cost construction and the use of traditional architectural elements. They developed cross-ventilated buildings with courtyards, in Oran, Algeria and Casablanca. In 1951, together with Shadrach Woods and engineer Henri Piot they became the leaders of ATBAT-Africa, in Tangier, Morocco, a workshop conceived as a research center, where architects engineers and technicians worked in an interdisciplinary way, closed in 1952 due to the political tension of the time.

In 1954, he returned to Paris and opened his own office, together with engineers Pablo Dony and Piot, and architects Alexis Josic and Woods. The office was aimed at reducing the costs of building three-bedroom apartments. The office had important projects such as the extension of Bagnols-sur-Cèze (1956) and the expansion design of the city of Le Mirail (1961) and Toulouse (1970). In 1955 he founded a firm together with Woods and Josic. The partnership was dissolved in 1969, from which time he continued to work as an architect and urban planner, undertaking projects in tourist-centric regions and in the Middle East ranging from housing to schools and vacation homes. He remained in teaching until after the student riots of May 1968 and was a guest lecturer at several schools of architecture in France and abroad. In 1977 he published Batir la Vie. He died in Paris on May 10, 1995.

Candilis gained notoriety from a number of developments he designed with Alexis Josic and Shadrach Woods, including Le Mirail, Toulouse and Carriere Centrale in Casablanca.

Candilis was also a founding member of Team 10.
