= Alexis Josic =

French architect

Aljoša Josić (Serbian: Аљоша Јосић), known in France as Alexis Josic (Bečej, Kingdom of Serbs, Croats and Slovenes, 24 May 1921 – 10 March 2011) was a French architect.

Son of the Serbian painter Mladen Josić, he studied architecture in Belgrade, graduating in 1948. Due to his opposition to Tito's regime he emigrated to France, where he soon joined Georges Candilis and Shadrach Woods; together they established the practice Candilis-Josic-Woods. They became famous with their projects for Le Mirail, Toulouse, and for the Free University of Berlin.

In 1965 he established the Atelier Josic.

== Bibliography ==
- Jürgen Joedicke, Candilis, Josic, Woods, une décennie d'architecture et d'urbanisme, éd. Eyrolles, 1968, p. 224
