= Mouna Hachim =

Moroccan journalist (born 1967)

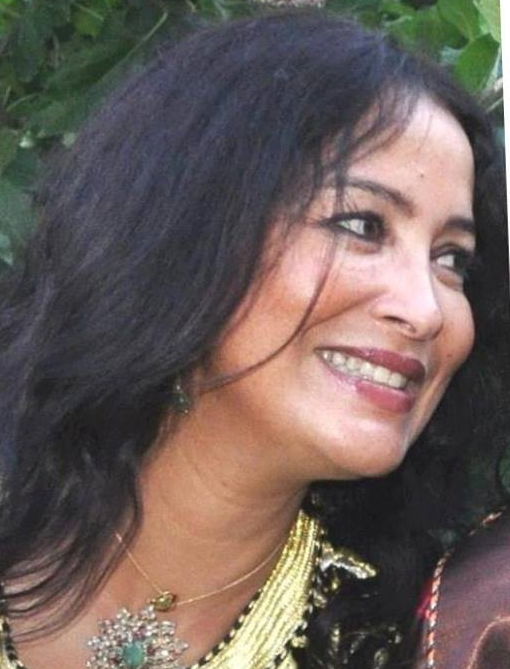
- Mouna Hachim (Casablanca, 2012)
- Born: 24 October 1967 (age 58); Casablanca, Morocco
- Education: University of Hassan II Casablanca
- Writing career
- Language: French

Mouna Hachim (Note: In French, the form “Hachem” is found.) (born 24 October 1967) is a Moroccan writer and journalist. She has published several novels and non-fiction books. She has also created documentaries.

== Early life and education ==
Mouna Hachim was born in Casablanca, 24 October 1967.

She studied at University of Hassan II Casablanca, where she obtained a degree in French literature (faculty of letters and human sciences at Aïn Chock) and a diploma of in-depth studies in comparative literature (faculty of letters and human sciences Ben M'Sick-Sidi Othmane). Her bachelor's thesis focused on the representation of Muslims in the Song of Roland and her DEA thesis on French courtesy in the Middle Ages with the first four troubadours of Langue d'oc.

== Career ==
Since 1992, Hachim has worked in the Moroccan written press, and, since 2008, has written in L'Économiste, in the section, "Chronicles of yesterday and today". From 2007 to 2009, she hosted a daily column on Radio Atlantic, "Secrets of family names".

In January 2004, she self-published a novel, Les Enfants de la Chaouia, a family saga spanning three generations, seen as a microcosm of Moroccan society in full upheaval since the beginning of the 20th century. In 2007, she also self-published a scholarly work, Dictionnaire des noms de famille du Maroc (Dictionary of Family Names of Morocco), a revised and expanded edition of which was published in 2012 by Éditions Le Fennec.

In 2011, and for three consecutive years, she was a member of the jury for the La Mamounia literary award, which rewards French-speaking Moroccan writers.

In July 2014, based on her research, Hachim presented a historical documentary in four episodes on the Medi1 TV channel, under the title "La Route des Origines", which presented a journey through Moroccan history centered on place names and the names of tribes and families.

In 2015, she participated in the collective work published by La Croisée des chemins under the title Ce qui nous somme : réflexions marocaines après les événements des 7 au 11 janvier 2015 à Paris after the Charlie Hebdo shooting of 7 January 2015 and the Republican marches of 11 January 2015 in Paris.

In April 2016, she published a historical work under the title Chroniques insolites de notre histoire: Maroc, des origines à 1907 (Najah al Jadida, 2016), which carries out a rereading shifted from official accounts and school textbooks; it was republished in France by Éditions Érick Bonnier in September 2018 under the title l’Histoire inattendue du Maroc.

With the same publisher, she published in September 2019, a historical novel between Europe and Morocco, based on actual events and characters, entitled Les manuscrits perdus (The Lost Manuscripts). She revisits history again in a romantic way with the novel Ben Toumert ou Les derniers jours des Voilés (La Croisée des Chemins, Casablanca, 2021), a close-up on the fall of the Almoravid dynasty from the viewpoint of women.

== Personal life ==
She is married and the mother of two children.

== Selected works ==
- Les Enfants de la Chaouia (2004) ISBN 9954834850
- Dictionnaire des noms de famille du Maroc (2007) ISBN 9954852417
- Dictionnaire des noms de famille du Maroc (2011) ISBN 9789954306987
- Chroniques insolites de notre histoire - Maroc, des origines à 1907) (2016) ISBN 9789954371848
- Histoire inattendue du Maroc (2018) ISBN 2367601526
- Les manuscrits perdus (2019) ISBN 2367601755
- Ben Toumert ou les derniers jours des Voilés (2021) ISBN 9789920769952
- Casablanca, le livre noir de la ville blanche Broché (2023) ISBN 9920753858

== Filmography ==
=== Documentary series ===
- La route des origines, طريق الاصل, in four parts, Médi 1 TV
- Marocains dans l'histoire (ep.20), مغاربة في التاريخ, Le360
