= Moulay Rachid =

Moulay Rachid may refer to:

- Prince Moulay Rachid ben al Hassan of Morocco
- Moulay Rachid (district), Casablanca
- Moulay Rachid (arrondissement), Casablanca
- Al-Rashid of Morocco, or Rashid ibn Ali al-Sharif, the founder of the Alaouite dynasty of Morocco
