= The Country of Others =

2020 novel by Leïla Slimani

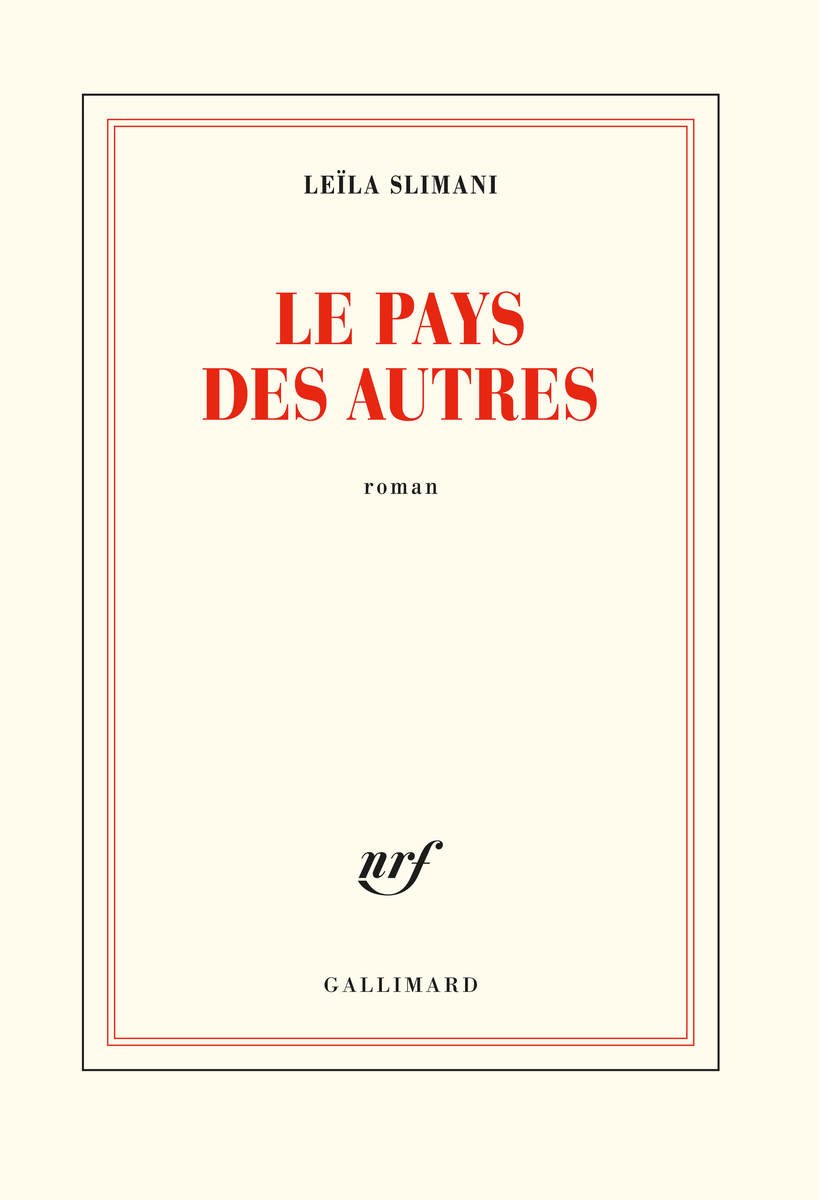
- Collection Blanche cover (first edition)
- Author: Leïla Slimani
- Language: French
- Publisher: Éditions Gallimard
- Publication date: 5 March 2020
- Publication place: France
- Pages: 368
- ISBN: 978-2-07-288799-4
- OCLC: 1199299619

The Country of Others (French: Le Pays des Autres; published as In the Country of Others in the United States) is a 2020 historical fiction novel by Leïla Slimani.

== Plot ==
The novel follows a collection of characters, beginning with Mathilde, an Alsatian woman who moves to Meknes, Morocco, with her new husband, Amine, whom she met while he served in the French army during the second World War. Mathilde does not initially like her new country, and she struggles to fit in with the new culture, religion, and views on women's places.

Amine's family is traditional. Selma, his younger sister, is very beautiful and, as a result, her older brothers are very controlling over her. Selma feels trapped in her family home. Omar, Amine's brother, is a political revolutionary and is suspicious of the growing French colonial presence in Morocco.

Despite her initial woes, Mathilde has two children with Amine. Aïcha, the eldest daughter, grows up in a unique position in Moroccan society and finds solace in religion at her Christian school. She faces bullying due to her ethnic background and inability to fit in with her well-mannered school peers. Selim, the younger son, is not as well described and is a toddler for the majority of the novel.

Mathilde finds it hard to make friends with the French colonists. Eventually, she and Amine befriend a Hungarian couple, a doctor and his wife. Upon finding out that her father has died, Mathilde returns to France to visit her family. Aïcha misses her mother terribly. In Alsace, Mathilde contemplates staying, but ultimately decides Morocco is her home now and cannot abandon her children.

Later, Omar disappears, and the family believe it has to do with his political involvements. A friend from Amine's time in the army comes to visit, who is secretly gay and in love with Amine. Selma, who wants to escape her family, begins dating a French pilot and is photographed with him by an enthusiastic photographer in the Ville Nouvelle section of town. Amine spots this photograph in the window of the store, and arrives at home angry. He forces Selma to marry his friend from the army.

The novel ends as tensions continue to rise between the French settlers and the native Moroccans.

== Production ==
The Country of Others is Slimani's third novel and the first in a trilogy based on her family history. It is Slimani's first historical novel. She said that she wanted to draw a comparison between Moroccan women's fight for liberation and Morocco's fight for independence.

Slimani said that after her second novel Lullaby won the Prix Goncourt in 2016 she wanted to "write something that was difficult because as an artist who had some congratulations, it’s important to do something where there is the possibility of failing".

Faber and Faber acquired publishing rights in the United Kingdom and the Commonwealth, excluding Canada, from Éditions Gallimard in March 2021.

== Reception ==
Tessa Hadley the novel as "uncannily good at searching out the uncomfortable pressure points where class hurts and privilege excludes and crucifies". Jonathan Myerson noted that "incidents are included even though they seem to have no pay-off". The Times's John Phipps called the novel a "panoramic, ambitious tale". Houman Barekat criticised Slimani's "impassive prose style" as "dreary", and "conspicuously over-reliant on certain go-to words". Meena Kandasamy characterised the work as "a novel about sex and power".

The novel was longlisted for the 2022 Andrew Carnegie Medal for Excellence in Fiction.
