= ALH Holding =

- Type: Private
- Industry: Real estate, education, hospitality, agriculture
- Founded: 1957
- Founder: Lahbib Laghrari
- Headquarters: Casablanca, Morocco
- Area served: Morocco, West Africa
- Key people: Mohamed Laghrari (CEO)
- Number of employees: 1100 (2025)
- Subsidiaries: ALH Agriculture; ALH Real Estate; ALH Hospitality; ALH Education; AH Africa
- Website: https://alh-holding.ma

ALH Holding (formerly Al Hoceinia Holding) is a Moroccan holding founded in 1957 by Lahbib Laghrari operating in real estate, hospitality, agriculture and education.

== History ==
The group's origins date back to 1957, with the construction of the Sbata district in Casablanca. In the late 1960s, between 1967 and 1969, the company expanded into the agricultural sector through the acquisition of two estates in the Beni Mellal region.

In 1989, ALH Holding was established to consolidate the Laghrari family's activities. Between the 1990s and 2000s, the company expanded into real estate, developing shopping galleries in Casablanca as well as residential and coastal projects. In 2008, Mohamed and Hamza Laghrari were appointed as co-managing directors.

The real estate subsidiary, ALH Real Estate, expanded to Marrakesh in 2017 and to Agadir in 2018. In 2019, the company launched the Héritage Immobilier brand, notably associated with the Cabo Huerto project.

In 2021, ALH Holding created AH Africa, a subsidiary dedicated to real estate development in West Africa. In 2022, Mohamed Laghrari was appointed CEO of ALH Holding.

In 2024, the holding inaugurated the Radisson Hotel Casablanca Gauthier La Citadelle. In April 2025, ALH Real Estate launched the residential project Bianca in Skhirat. In September 2025, ALH Holding, through its subsidiary ALH Hospitality, announced the acquisition of the Be Live Collection Marrakech Adults Only, originally inaugurated in 2018.

== Activities and subsidiaries ==
ALH Holding operates in real estate, hospitality, education and agriculture, through 5 subsidiaries.

- ALH Agriculture
- ALH Real Estate
- ALH Hospitality
- ALH Education
- AH Africa
