= Abdallah Zrika =

Moroccan poet

Abdallah Zrika (Arabic: عبدالله زريقة; born 1953 in Casablanca, Morocco) is one of the most famous poets of Morocco. His poetry is set in free verse, based on spoken language and unrivalled in contemporary Arabic literature in its spontaneity. For the Moroccan youth of the politically and socially repressive years of the 1970s, he represented the ideal of poetic writing, of freedom of living and expression.

== Life and literary work ==
Zrika grew up in the poor neighbourhood of Ben M'Sick in metropolitan Casablanca. At the age of twelve, he wrote his first poems. In 1977, he published his first compilation of poems, Dance of the Head and the Rose. The literary magazine Words without Borders gave the following account of the book and its author: "In these so-called "years of lead" of political repression & student unrest, the book was an immediate popular success with the younger Moroccan generation — as were the many poetry readings he gave to audiences that often numbered in the thousands."

In 1978, six of his poems were deemed morally dangerous by the authorities, and Zrika was sentenced to two years in prison. Since then, he has become one of the major voices in modern Arabic poetry. Besides poetic works, Zrika also has published novels and texts for the theatre. In live performances and readings, he has collaborated with other artists of different disciplines, such as musicians, singers, playwrights and actors, video artists, etc.

Apart from his career as a poet, Zrika also holds a degree in sociology. Several of his collections of poetry have been translated into French, and some into English.

== Works in translations ==
in French:

- Rires de l’arbre à palabre, poems, L’Harmattan, Paris, 1982.
- Bougies noires, poems, La Différence, Paris, 1998.
- Petites proses, L’Escampette, Bordeaux, 1998.
- Échelles de la métaphysique, L’Escampette, Bordeaux, 2000.
- La colombe du texte, CIPM, Spectres Familiers, Marseille, 2003.
- Insecte de l'infini, poems, bilingual, 2007. ISBN 2729117091
- Le cinéma de l’après-midi, prose, Maelstrom, Brussels, 2012.
- La naissance des lieux, prose, with engravings by Mustapha Belkouch, bilingual, éditions Méridianes, Montpellier, 2014
- La solitude des abattoirs du blanc, poems, bilingual, Les Cahiers de L’Approche, Rennes, 2015.
- Tortue de l’effacement, poems, bilingual, EditionsApic, Algiers, 2018.
- Ivresse de l’effacement, poems, engravings by Rachid Kouraïchi, bilingual, Editions Méridianes, Montpellier, 2020.

in English:

- Poems from The Insect of Infinity, translated by Tim DeMay
- Mice of the Wheel of Loneliness, translated by Pierre Joris
- Excerpts from the Dove-Text, originally written in French
- Banipal magazine no. 61, 2018: Three poems, translated by Tim DeMay
- Two texts from Petites Proses, translated by El Habib Louai

His poems have also been published in French magazines, including Esprit, Autrement, Refuge, Le croquant, Petite, and RMM.

== Novels in Arabic ==
- المراه مع فرسين (The woman with the two horses)
- مقبره السعاده (Graveyard of Happiness)

(published by Le Fennec publishers in Casablanca)

== See also ==
- Modern Arabic literature
- Moroccan literature
- Arabic poetry
