= Eli Newberger =

American pediatrician

- Born: December 26, 1940; Brooklyn, New York, U.S.
- Died: October 24, 2024 (aged 83); Dalton, Massachusetts, U.S.
- Education: Yale University (BS); Yale School of Medicine (MD); Harvard School of Public Health
- Occupations: Pediatrician, child-protection researcher, author, jazz musician
- Employer(s): Boston Children's Hospital; Harvard Medical School
- Known for: Child-protection work at Boston Children's Hospital; expert testimony in the Louise Woodward case; New Black Eagle Jazz Band
- Spouse: Carolyn Moore Newberger
- Children: 1

Eli Newberger (December 26, 1940 - October 24, 2024) was an American pediatrician, child-protection researcher, author, and jazz musician. He founded the Child Protection Team at Boston Children's Hospital and later directed the hospital's Family Development Program, work that helped shape multidisciplinary hospital responses to child abuse in the United States. He taught at Harvard Medical School and published widely on child maltreatment, family violence, and child welfare.

Newberger was also known for his role as a prosecution medical expert in the 1997 trial of British au pair Louise Woodward, and for later public commentary on the limits and risks of child-protection medicine. Outside medicine, he was a jazz tubist and pianist, a co-founder of the New Black Eagle Jazz Band, and later a performer with Eli and the Hot Six.

== Early life and education ==
Newberger was born in Brooklyn, New York, on December 26, 1940, to Joseph Newberger and Helen Farber Newberger. He grew up in Mount Vernon, New York. His early musical education included piano, organ, and tuba. While in high school, he studied at the Juilliard School and took tuba lessons with William Bell of the New York Philharmonic.

At Yale University, Newberger majored in music theory and composition and was named Scholar of the House in music. He earned an M.D. from Yale School of Medicine in 1966. He completed an internship in internal medicine at Yale-New Haven Hospital from 1966 to 1967, then served from 1967 to 1969 as a Peace Corps physician in Upper Volta, now Burkina Faso, as a member of the United States Public Health Service. He later completed pediatric training at Boston Children's Hospital and earned a master's degree in epidemiology from Harvard School of Public Health in 1972.

== Medical career ==
=== Boston Children's Hospital and child-protection work ===
Newberger began his association with Boston Children's Hospital during his pediatric residency. In 1970, while a resident, he noticed a pattern of rehospitalizations among children who had previously been reported to child-protection authorities. According to The Boston Globe, he brought the issue to the hospital's physician-in-chief, researched how other hospitals were responding to suspected child abuse, and was then asked to establish a child-abuse unit at Boston Children's. The multidisciplinary team he formed included physicians, nurses, and social workers and was later described by The Boston Globe as a "national blueprint" for similar hospital programs.

Newberger founded the hospital's Child Protection Team and Family Development Program, which combined clinical care, training, and research on the welfare of children and families. The Berkshire Edge obituary described his Family Development Study as including an early domestic-violence program in a pediatric hospital. He remained associated with Boston Children's Hospital and Harvard Medical School for more than three decades.

=== Research and writing ===
Newberger's medical writing treated child abuse as a clinical, legal, social, and family issue. In the 1978 article "The medicalization and legalization of child abuse", he argued that child-abuse interventions could be distorted when family crises and childhood injuries were reduced too narrowly to medical or legal categories. His later work included studies and reviews on hospital decision-making, child physical abuse, family violence, and pediatric social illness.

In 1983, Newberger, Carolyn Moore Newberger, and Robert L. Hampton published "Child Abuse: The Current Theory Base and Future Research Needs" in the Journal of the American Academy of Child Psychiatry. He also wrote for general readers, most notably The Men They Will Become: The Nature and Nurture of Male Character, published in 1999.

=== Expert testimony and public advocacy ===
Newberger was a prosecution witness in the 1997 trial of Louise Woodward, a British au pair accused in the death of nine-month-old Matthew Eappen. At the time, Newberger was medical director of the child-abuse unit at Boston Children's Hospital and had examined the child. He testified that, in his opinion, the injuries were consistent with violent shaking and head trauma. Woodward was convicted of second-degree murder, but the trial judge later reduced the conviction to involuntary manslaughter and sentenced her to time served. In 2015, after another Massachusetts nanny case involving shaken-baby allegations drew renewed attention, Newberger publicly defended the diagnosis of abusive head trauma while others questioned its use in ambiguous cases.

Newberger also criticized what he saw as overreach in some child-protection investigations. In a 2013 Boston Globe story about medical child-abuse allegations, he warned that physicians in the specialty had "enormous and really unchecked power" and said that some state agencies were too deferential to hospitals in contested cases. In 2020, in a Maine case reviewed for a family's attorney, Newberger wrote that the family had been "grievously harmed" by the child-protection investigation.

During the Catholic clergy sexual-abuse scandal in Boston, Newberger and Carolyn Moore Newberger were among specialists who said that Cardinal Bernard Law had rejected their 1993 advice to report abusive priests to law enforcement and keep them away from minors. Newberger had previously served on a 1971 gubernatorial commission that recommended mandatory reporting of child abuse in Massachusetts.

== Music career ==
Newberger maintained an active career as a jazz musician alongside his medical work. He began playing tuba as a child, became interested in jazz after hearing Louis Armstrong, and performed as a young musician before entering medicine. In 1969, after returning from West Africa, he helped form what became the New Black Eagle Jazz Band with other musicians in the Boston area. He initially played piano with the group and later switched to tuba.

With the New Black Eagle Jazz Band, Newberger appeared at concerts and festivals in the United States and Europe and recorded extensively. His tuba playing was noted for its melodic and lyrical approach; a 1986 review by John S. Wilson in The New York Times, quoted in The Boston Globe, praised the lightness and musicality of his tuba work with banjoist Jimmy Mazzy. Newberger left the New Black Eagle Jazz Band in 2001 and continued performing with other ensembles, including Eli and the Hot Six.

Newberger served as a trustee of Berklee College of Music and as an overseer of the New England Conservatory. In his later years in the Berkshires, he and Carolyn Moore Newberger supported Kids 4 Harmony, a youth music program inspired by El Sistema, and helped develop the Cupcake Philharmonic, a family-oriented ensemble that performed in schools, libraries, and community settings.

== Books and reception ==
Newberger's best-known book for general readers was The Men They Will Become: The Nature and Nurture of Male Character, published by Perseus Books in 1999. Publishers Weekly described the book as an effort to explain boys' moral development through child development, psychology, education, and family life. Kirkus Reviews gave a more mixed assessment, calling it research-oriented and anecdotal while suggesting that it was more useful as background reading than as a practical guide for busy parents.

A jazz album sharing the book's title, The Men They Will Become, was released in 2000 and featured Newberger with Jimmy Mazzy and Butch Thompson.

== Personal life and death ==
Newberger married Carolyn Moore on May 31, 1962. She became a psychologist, artist, musician, and frequent collaborator in both child-development work and music. They had one daughter.

After living for many years in Brookline, Massachusetts, Newberger and his wife moved to Lenox, Massachusetts. He died on October 24, 2024, at Craneville Place in Dalton, Massachusetts, at the age of 83.

== Selected bibliography ==
- Newberger, Eli H.; Bourne, Richard (1978). "The medicalization and legalization of child abuse". American Journal of Orthopsychiatry. PMID 707611.
- Newberger, Eli H. (1982). Child Abuse. Boston: Little, Brown.
- Newberger, Eli H.; Newberger, Carolyn Moore; Hampton, Robert L. (1983). "Child Abuse: The Current Theory Base and Future Research Needs". Journal of the American Academy of Child Psychiatry. 22 (3): 262–268.
- Katz, Mitchell H.; Hampton, Robert L.; Newberger, Eli H.; Bowles, Roy T.; Snyder, Jane C. (April 1986). "Returning children home: clinical decision making in cases of child abuse and neglect". American Journal of Orthopsychiatry. 56 (2): 253–262. doi:10.1111/j.1939-0025.1986.tb02725.x. PMID 3706504.
- Newberger, Eli H.; Hampton, Robert L.; Marx, Thomas J.; White, Kathleen M. (1986). "Child abuse and pediatric social illness". American Journal of Orthopsychiatry. PMID 3789105.
- Newberger, Eli H. (June 1993). "Child physical abuse". Primary Care. 20 (2): 317–327. PMID 8356154.
- Newberger, Eli H. (1999). The Men They Will Become: The Nature and Nurture of Male Character. Cambridge, Massachusetts: Perseus Books. ISBN 9780738201139.
- Newberger, Eli H. (1999). "The Medicine of the Tuba". In Curnen, Mary G. McCrea; Spiro, Howard; St. James, Deborah (eds.). Doctors Afield. Yale University Press.

== Honors ==
In 2022, Friends of Children honored Newberger with its Children's Champion Award.

== See also ==
- Child abuse
- Child protection
- Abusive head trauma
- New Black Eagle Jazz Band
