= Murder of Ana Walshe =

2023 murder of Serbian-American woman

- Murder of Ana Walshe (Massachusetts)
- Location: Cohasset, Massachusetts, U.S.
- Date: January 1, 2023; 3 years ago
- Attack type: Disappearance, murder, uxoricide
- Victims: Ana Walshe, aged 39
- Perpetrator: Brian Walshe
- Verdict: Guilty on all counts
- Convictions: First-degree murder; Misleading a police investigation; Improper conveyance of a human body
- Sentence: Life imprisonment without the possibility of parole

On January 4, 2023, Ana Walshe, (Note: Ana's surname at birth was Ljubičić, sometimes spelled without diacritics in English language sources. During her first marriage, her surname was Knipp or Ljubičić Knipp. Walshe is written as Volš in Serbian.) a Serbian-American real estate executive, was reported missing by her employer and, separately, by her husband, Brian Walshe. Ana was last seen early on January 1 at the couple's home in Cohasset, having had dinner with Brian and a family friend on New Year's Eve.

Brian told the police that Ana had flown to Washington, D.C., where she had a second residence, for a work emergency. After an initial arrest on January 8 for misleading investigators, Brian was charged on January 18 with murder and disinterring a body without authority, to which he pleaded not guilty; prosecutors allege that he killed her and dismembered and disposed of her body.

On December 15, 2025, Brian was found guilty of the first-degree murder of Ana. He had previously pleaded guilty to counts of misleading police and illegally disposing of a body which was never found.

== Background ==
Ana Walshe
- Ana Volš
- Born: Ana Ljubičić; 12 April 1983; Belgrade, SR Serbia, SFR Yugoslavia
- Disappeared: January 1, 2023 (aged 39); Cohasset, Massachusetts, U.S.
- Status: Missing for 3 years and 10 months; presumed dead on January 18, 2023
- Spouse: Brian Walshe
- Children: 3

Ana Ljubičić was born in Belgrade, SR Serbia, SFR Yugoslavia, on April 12, 1983. She was raised in Belgrade where she attended the Fifth Belgrade Gymnasium and obtained a BA in French language and literature from the University of Belgrade. She emigrated to the United States in 2005, eventually becoming a dual citizen. She found work in the hospitality industry, including at The Inn at Little Washington. According to Boston 25 News, she is thought to have met Brian Walshe during her two years working at the Wheatleigh Hotel in Lenox, Massachusetts. She and Brian married in 2016 and she took his surname. They subsequently had three sons, who at the time of her disappearance were ages two, four, and six.

After working at several more hotels, Ana Walshe became a regional general manager at the real estate company Tishman Speyer in February 2022, splitting her time between her home with Brian in Cohasset, Massachusetts, and a residence in Washington, D.C., where she worked.

In 2021, Brian pleaded guilty in federal court on three charges of fraud relating to selling counterfeit Andy Warhol works. At the time of Ana's disappearance, he was on house arrest awaiting sentencing.

== Disappearance ==
The Walshes and their friend had dinner together on New Year's Eve 2022. In the first hours of 2023, Ana called her mother, sister, and maid of honor, all of whom were unavailable. She was last seen around 4 am. Brian says he spent the following day in Swampscott with his mother.

On January 4, both Tishman Speyer and Brian Walshe reported Ana missing. Brian told the police that Ana had left the house early for a flight from Boston's Logan International Airport to Washington, D.C., after a work emergency caused her to move up a trip scheduled for January 3. Police could not confirm whether she had gotten on a flight or gotten a ride to the airport on January 1; they found that while she had indeed previously booked a flight for January 3, she had not boarded the flight, and that her credit and debit cards had not been used since January 1.

== Investigation and charges ==
Brian Walshe was arrested on January 8 and charged with misleading the police in the investigation into Ana's disappearance, after police could not find evidence that he had been to the CVS or Whole Foods in Swampscott on January 1 as he had claimed. The prosecutor also alleged that Brian had gone to Lowe's on the morning of January 1 in Rockland, Massachusetts, and spent $463 on cleaning supplies, a hammer, and wire snips. Police received a search warrant for the Walshe residence and in the basement found blood and a damaged, bloody knife. He pleaded not guilty.

On January 18, Brian Walshe was arrested again and charged with murder and disinterring a body without authority. Prosecutors allege that he killed her, dismembered her, and then disposed of the body. As evidence, they cited his Google search history on multiple devices including his son's iPad, which they allege includes terms like "How long before a body starts to smell", "Dismemberment and the best ways to dispose of a body", and "Can you be charged with murder without a body". Brian pleaded not guilty. On March 30, Brian was indicted on the charges of first-degree murder, misleading a police investigation, and "improper conveyance of a human body".

The event gained significant public attention in the United States and Serbia. Serbia's Ministry of Foreign Affairs has communicated, through the Serbian consulate-general in New York, with the Norfolk District Attorney's office, in order to provide Ana Walshe's mother with non-publicly available information about the course of the investigation.

== Trial ==
On November 19, 2025, Brian changed his plea to guilty for the two lesser charges of misleading a police investigation, and improper conveyance of a human body, but maintained his innocence on the murder charge. On December 15, he was found guilty of the first-degree murder of Ana. Three days later, he was sentenced to life in prison without the possibility of parole.

== See also ==
- List of murder convictions without a body
- List of solved missing person cases (2020s)
