= Murder of the Krim siblings =

2012 murder in New York City, US

Murders of Lucia and Leo Krim
- Location: 40.7794°N 73.9769°W; 57 West 75th Street, Manhattan, New York, United States
- Date: October 25, 2012 (EST)
- Attack type: Double-murder by stabbing, child murder, attempted murder-suicide
- Weapon: Kitchen knives
- Deaths: 2
- Injuries: 1 (self-inflicted by perpetrator)
- Perpetrator: Yoselyn Ortega
- Motive: Unknown; possibly revenge against the children's mother
- Verdict: Guilty on all counts
- Convictions: First-degree murder (2 counts): Second-degree murder (2 counts; lesser included offenses)
- Sentence: Two consecutive life sentences without the possibility of parole

Lucia and Leo Krim, aged 6 and 2 respectively, were murdered in the late afternoon of October 25, 2012, at the La Rochelle apartment building on the Upper West Side of Manhattan in New York City. The children's part-time caretaker, Yoselyn Ortega, was convicted of stabbing the children to death with kitchen knives while their mother Marina Krim and three-year-old sister Nessie were a few blocks away at a swimming lesson. Upon returning home, their mother and sister found Lucia and Leo dead in a bathtub at the family apartment. Ortega then began stabbing herself repeatedly in the neck and throat. She survived the self-inflicted wounds.

On February 22, 2018, twelve jurors were chosen for Ortega's trial, and opening statements began March 1 in Manhattan Supreme Court. On April 18, 2018, Ortega was found guilty of first-degree murder and second-degree murder. Ortega was sentenced on May 14, 2018, to life in prison without the possibility of parole.

== Background ==
The children lived with their parents, Marina and Kevin Krim, in New York City. Lucia was known as "Lulu." The family moved there from San Francisco in 2010. Kevin Krim was a digital content executive at the television network CNBC. Marina Krim, a former kindergarten teacher, was a stay-at-home mother, art teacher, and blogger who chronicled the children's lives.

== Discovery of killings ==
On October 25, 2012, at about 5:35 pm, Marina Krim returned to her apartment in a 10-story doorman building at 57 West 75th Street and Columbus Avenue on the Upper West Side of Manhattan with her 3-year-old daughter, Nessie, from the girl's swimming lesson at a nearby YMCA.

The 36-year-old mother returned to the apartment earlier than scheduled because Ortega had failed to show up at Lulu's ballet lesson where they had agreed to meet. She entered the apartment but, as it was dark and quiet, found no one. After returning to the lobby and consulting with the doorman, who had seen Ortega and the children return to the apartment shortly before, Marina and her daughter Nessie returned to the family apartment. In the bathroom, she discovered her motionless two-year-old son, Leo Krim, and six-year-old daughter, Lucia "Lulu" Krim. They were clothed; each had multiple stab wounds and were in a bathtub, filled with blood.

After Marina Krim discovered what had happened to her children, Yoselyn "Josie" Ortega, their caregiver of two years who was on the floor next to the bathtub, slashed her own wrists and began to violently stab herself in the neck and throat with a kitchen knife.

This scene was also witnessed by the apartment building's superintendent and his 10-year-old son. The bodies of the two children were removed from the building on a single stretcher. Kevin Krim, 37 years old at the time, learned of the events that night from police at John F. Kennedy Airport upon returning from a business trip to San Francisco.

Ortega told police investigators that Lucia, who suffered defensive wounds, had fought back when she was attacked. She said 2-year-old Leo was sleeping when the attack started.

== Perpetrator ==
Ortega, a naturalized U.S. citizen for 10 years at the time, was originally from Santiago de los Caballeros in the Dominican Republic, and was 50 years old at the time she murdered the Krim children. She was living on Riverside Drive in Manhattan's Hamilton Heights neighborhood with her 17-year-old son Jesus, her sister, and her niece.

In interviews with the New York City Police Department (NYPD), Ortega, who was paid $18 an hour, claimed she was upset that her employer, Marina Krim, responded to her inquiry about needing more hours (due to money troubles) by suggesting she could do housework. The NYPD and friends of the nanny said she indicated that she was upset because the Krims would not pay her more money. However, family and friends who knew the Krims, as well as Ortega's own family, said that Ortega was close to the children and was treated very well by the Krims. The Krims paid for her plane tickets to see her family in the Dominican Republic and, on one occasion, accompanied her on vacation there.

Ortega survived her self-inflicted wounds, and was later deemed mentally competent to stand trial by two New York State psychiatrists. She was incarcerated at Elmhurst Hospital Prison Ward psychiatric hospital without bail while she prepared for her trial with a private attorney contracted by New York State to serve as her public defender.

== Trial ==
In November 2012, Ortega was indicted on two counts of first-degree murder. Over the next five years, prior to trial, Ortega made approximately 90 court appearances. In April 2016, Judge Gregory Carro made a plea offer to Ortega over the objection of the prosecution (who said the only appropriate sentence would be life without parole) of 30-years-to-life-in-prison, the minimum sentence for the two murder counts, in exchange for her guilty pleas. Ortega rejected the offer.

On February 22, 2018, 12 jurors were chosen for Ortega's trial as Judge Carro presided, and opening statements were scheduled for March 1 in Manhattan Supreme Court. The trial was expected to last four months, but ended after less than two. Ortega faced the possibility of life in prison. She pleaded not guilty to murder, and pursued a "psychiatric defense". Her lawyers argued that Ortega was mentally ill and should therefore not be held responsible for her acts, while the prosecutors argued that she was sound-minded and was in fact responsible.

Ortega was found guilty of first-degree murder and second-degree murder on April 18, 2018. On May 14, 2018, she was sentenced to life in prison without parole. In his ruling, Judge Carro said Ortega was "pure evil", blaming Ortega and her family for not seeking medical treatment for Ortega's depression and anxiety, and for hiding her condition from the Krims.

== Lulu & Leo Fund ==
The Krims subsequently set up the Lulu & Leo Fund, a non-profit charity that provides creative education programs for disadvantaged children, under an initiative called Choose Creativity. The Krim family posts photos and memories of their children on the Lulu & Leo Fund public Facebook page, including fundraising events and photos of art made by their children. In 2014, the Fund served 2,300 children. Since the murders of their two children, the Krims had two more children, Felix and Linus, who made cameos in a video related to the fund.

== Lulu & Leo's Law ==
The New York State Assembly and State Senate passed Lulu & Leo's Law in June 2018; New York State Governor Andrew Cuomo signed it into law in August 2018. It is the first of its kind in the US, making it a crime to knowingly and materially misrepresent the qualifications of a person applying for work as a child caregiver.

Kevin Krim said in the bill signing announcement, "We hired the woman who murdered our children based on a deliberate set of lies. Thanks to Governor Cuomo's support and the hard work of sponsors Assemblyman Otis, Senator Lanza and their co-sponsor, there is now a strong deterrent to that kind of deception.”

== In popular culture ==
French-Moroccan writer Leïla Slimani wrote a novel inspired by the killing of the Krim children. The original French title was Chanson Douce; in the UK the title was Lullaby, and in the U.S. The Perfect Nanny. It was well received in France, where it won the prestigious Prix Goncourt in 2016, but it did not achieve similar success in the United States.

== See also ==
- Death of Kristie Fischer
- Louise Woodward case, concerning an au pair convicted in 1997 of the involuntary manslaughter of an eight-month-old boy in her care.
