= Laetitia Coryn =

French comic artist, illustrator and voice actor

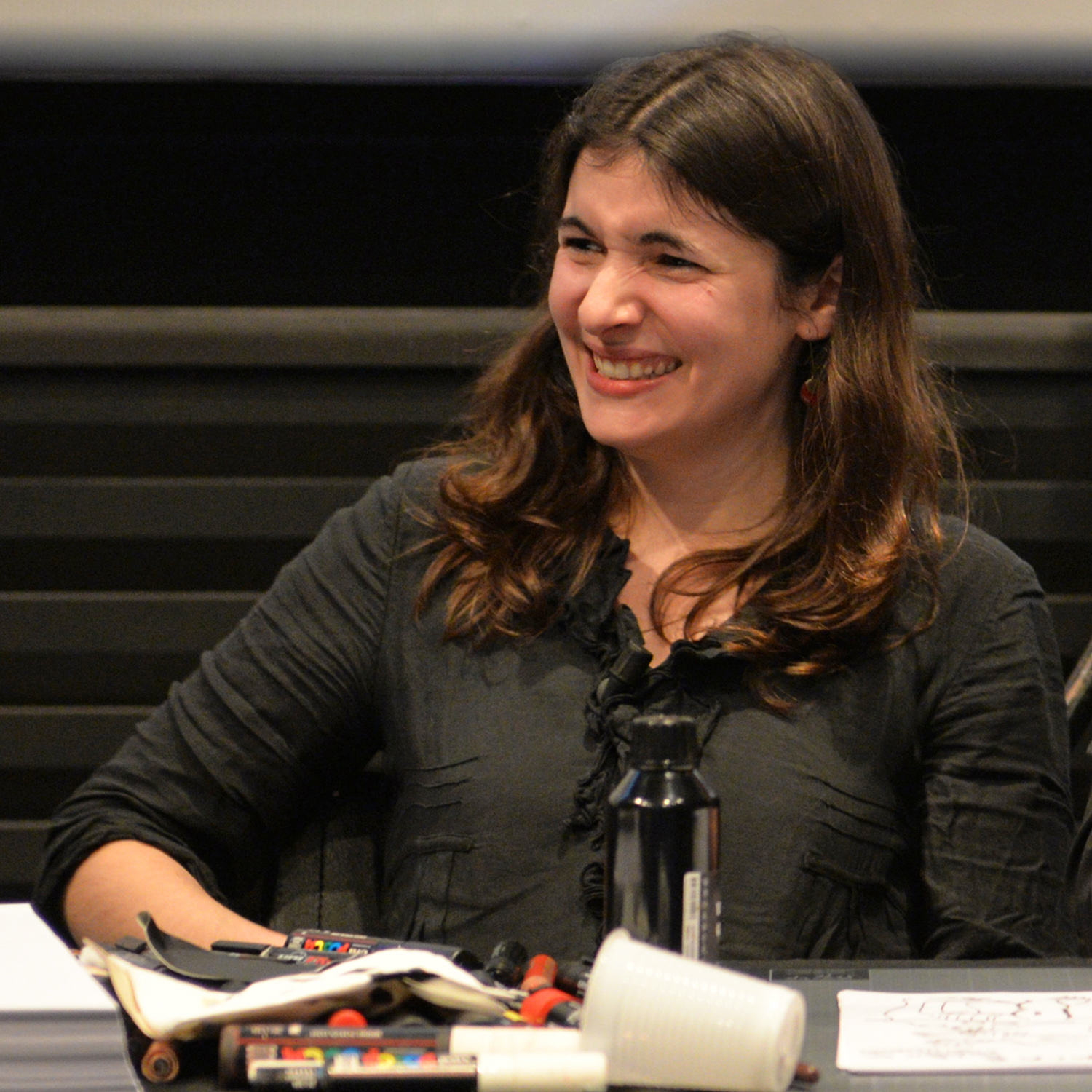
Laetitia Coryn, 2015

Laetitia Coryn (born 1984) is a French comic artist, illustrator and voice actor.

== Biography ==
At the age of fifteen, Coryn met the comic artist Jean-Claude Mézières, who inspired her to pursue a career in illustration. She went on to study at the École supérieure des arts et industries graphiques (ESAIG) in Paris and in 2009 she published her first comic book at Glénat Editions.

In 2016, Coryn collaborated with French psychiatrist and sexologist Philippe Brenot to publish Sex Story, a comic book about the cultural history of sex. It quickly became a bestseller in France and got translated into several other languages.

== Works ==
- Le monde merveilleux des vieux tome 1. Glenat, 2009, ISBN 9782723469173
- Le monde merveilleux des vieux tome 2. Glenat, 2009, ISBN 9782723467322
- Fenêtre sur cour d'école. Dargaud, 2014, ISBN 978-2-205-06743-9
- Le péril vieux. Dargaud, 2014, ISBN 9782755610529

=== Only as drawing artist ===
- with Pat Perna, Pat Ryu: La question de Dieu. 12 Bis, 2011, ISBN 9782356482464
- with Philippe Brenot, Isabelle Lebeau: Sex Story. Arenes, 2016, ISBN 9782352045038
  - Will McMorran (translator): The Story of Sex: From Apes to Robots. Penguin books, 2017, ISBN 978-1846149320
- with Leïla Slimani, Sandra Desmazières: Paroles d'honneur. Arenes, 2017, ISBN 9782352046547
