= Ben M'Sick (arrondissement) =

Ben M'Sick بن مسيك
- Arrondissement of Casablanca
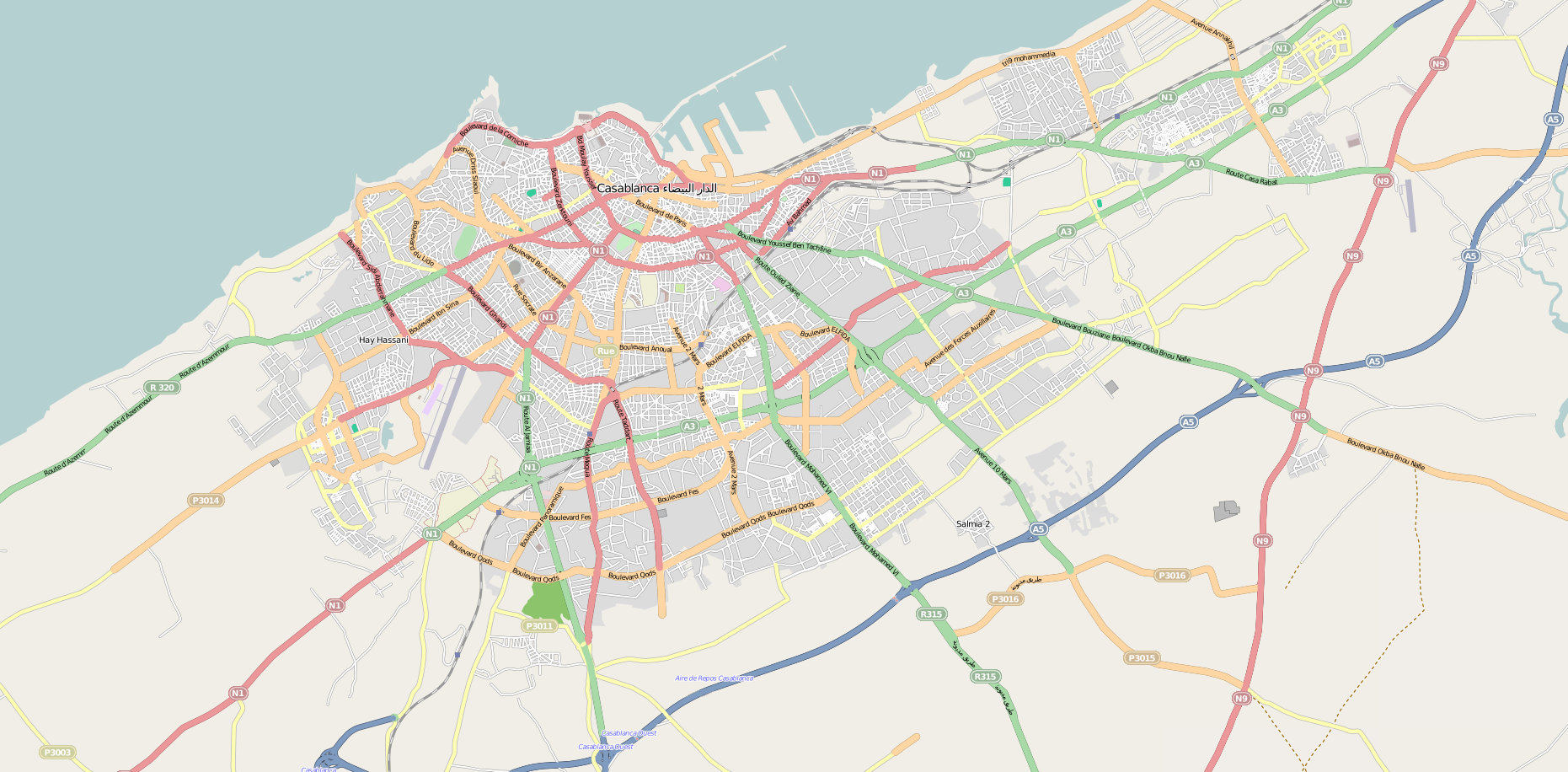
- Location in Greater Casablanca
- Coordinates: 33°33′28″N 7°34′46″W
- Country: Morocco
- Region: Casablanca-Settat
- Prefecture: Casablanca
- District: Ben M'Sick

Population (2004)
  - Total: 163,052
- Time zone: UTC+0 (GMT)

Ben M'Sick or Ben Msik (Arabic: بن مسيك) is an arrondissement of Casablanca, in the Ben M'Sick district of the Casablanca-Settat region of Morocco. As of 2004 it had 163,052 inhabitants.
