= La Mamounia literary award =

Moroccan literary prize

The La Mamounia literary award (French: prix de La Mamounia) was a Moroccan literary prize founded to promote Moroccan literature written in French. It was awarded from 2010 to 2015 and carried a prize money of 200,000 dirhams (about $22,000 in 2015).

The award was donated by the La Mamounia hotel in Marrakesh, which also hosted the award ceremonies every year. A jury consisting of well known literary figures selected the recipient out of a varying number of nominations every year. From 2011 on the jury was led by the French writer and critic Christine Orban as president.

Other jury members included the writers Douglas Kennedy (USA), Marie Laberge (Canada), Alain Mabanckou (Republic of the Congo), and Mouna Hachim (Morocco).

Due to financial issues the prize was not awarded after 2015.

== Recipients ==
- 2010: Mahi Binebine
- 2011: Mohamed Leftah
- 2012: Mohamed Nedali
- 2013: Rachid O
- 2014: Réda Dalil
- 2015: Leïla Slimani
