= Death of Kristie Fischer =

1991 U.S. infanticide case

On December 1, 1991, three-month-old baby Kristie Fischer died in a house fire in Thornwood, New York. Fischer's family accused their au pair, a Swiss woman named Olivia Riner, of killing the baby by arson. They stated that she had not attempted to rescue the baby, and therefore they believed she was guilty. Riner originated from Wettingen and was a babysitter for a Swiss family for three years. She worked as a pediatrician's assistant before being hired for a one-year term to care for the Fischer family, through the company EF Au Pair.

Alex Prud'homme of People wrote that "the case turned into an international cause célèbre", partly because it almost coincided with the release of the film The Hand That Rocks the Cradle and partly due to the gravity of the crime. Richard Lorant of the Associated Press wrote that the case was compared to the film and that it "frightened working mothers everywhere." William Glaberson of The New York Times wrote that the case "crystallized the concerns and worries parents have about leaving their children in other people's care".

== Incident ==
Fires started in three separate places in the Fischer house: In Riner's room, in Kristie's, and in the one belonging to Leah, Kristie's adult half-sister.

Prosecutor George Bolen accused Riner of gathering accelerants and putting paint thinner on the baby. Authorities charged Riner with second-degree murder and first-degree arson.

== Trial and verdict ==
Riner's agency hired lawyer Laura Brevetti one month prior to Fischer's death; Brevetti became Riner's attorney. Riner's trial began on June 2, 1992. The authorities had insufficient physical evidence to show that Riner had caused the fire. Brevetti stated that the police had botched the investigation: the crime scene was not secured, and was quickly returned to the home owners. Police officers – without being specifically tasked to investigate the scene and gather evidence – and craftsmen were able to enter the rooms without hindrance. A day after the fire, Leah, Kristie's adult half-sister, and her boyfriend, John Gallagher, were recorded on video searching through Leah's scorched belongings. During and shortly after the incident, the police did not properly interrogate Gallagher, who was friends with several police officers and was the first person to arrive at the scene.

Olivia Riner's interrogation was marred by language difficulties. Riner did not know what "lawyer" meant, and could not readily indicate a distance in feet. The recording of the interrogation was of poor quality, as the microphone was behind the interrogating officer, and even after adjusting the volume, jurors had trouble understanding Riner's expressions.

Only after a number of days did investigators try to gather fingerprints in Fischer's home (and found none that stemmed from the crime), and secured overlooked pieces of evidence, including the bag the body of Kristie Fischer had been found in. Brevetti also explained that the police did not consider other possible suspects for the fire. Brevetti stated that two men had started the fire.

George Bolen's suit mainly rested on the premise that Olivia Riner did not notice any other person – except the baby – in the house. Bolen asserted that the house was impenetrable, and that Riner would have certainly noticed a foreign person entering the house. During the trial, when Kristie's father was interrogated, he stated that he was able to enter the house unnoticed by Olivia mere hours before the fire, and surprised her. The family usually left the main door unlocked as long as somebody stayed at home.

The jury of seven men and five women ruled that Riner was not guilty after one day of deliberation. Some jurors stated that the prosecution never provided a motive for Riner committing the crime. Glaberson wrote that the verdict "appeared an endorsement of an aggressive defense strategy." The judge, Donald N. Silverman, stated his agreement with the result. Fischer's family maintained their belief that Riner was guilty. Authorities never filed any criminal charges related to this case against anyone else.

== Legacy ==
Geraldo Rivera, according to Lorant, suggested and "all but accused" John Gallagher of being the perpetrator. Lorant stated that Geraldo's presentation "didn't hurt" Riner's case.

Joyce Eggington wrote the book Circle of Fire: Murder and Betrayal in the "Swiss Nanny" Case. Eggington believed that Riner had perpetrated the crime. Eggington stated that she initially believed Riner was innocent, but that she later believed that nobody else could have set the fires.

Don Davis wrote the book The Nanny Murder Trial.

After the trial Riner found employment in Switzerland and began working in a doctor's office. Her lawyer stated that Riner did not wish to give interviews.

The Fischer family sued EF Au Pair, seeking an equivalent of 60 million British pounds.

== See also ==
- Louise Woodward case
- Murder of Krim siblings, in which a nanny was convicted of killing two children in her care

== Literature ==
- Davis, Don (1993). The Nanny Murder Trial. ASIN B000OA5RHC.
