= Othman Slimani =

Moroccan economist and banker (1941–2004)

- Born: 13 October 1941; Fez, Morocco
- Died: 2 April 2004 (aged 62); Morocco
- Occupations: Banker and Economist
- Known for: Minister of economics in the cabinet of Ahmed Osman
- Spouse: Béatrice-Najat Dhobb-Slimani
- Children: 3, including French-Moroccan writer Leïla Slimani

Othman Slimani (13 October 1941 – 2 April 2004) was a Moroccan economist and banker. He was minister of economics in the Moroccan government between 1977 and 1979 and later president of CIH Bank. He was indicted for embezzlement and misappropriation of public funds but was cleared posthumously.

== Early life and education ==
Slimani came from a modest background, but being a bright student allowed him to attend French-speaking schools in Morocco, and later obtain a scholarship to study in France. After earning a degree in economics at a French university he returned to Morocco and worked in the Ministry of Economics.

== Career ==
From 1977 to 1979 he served as minister of economics in the cabinet of Ahmed Osman. After Osman left office, Slimani became the president of the CIH Bank (Crédit immobilier et hôtelier), and led the bank until 1993, when he was fired after a finance scandal. In 2002 he was indicted for embezzlement and misappropriation of public funds together with 32 former CIH colleagues, and subsequently jailed for four months.

== Death and subsequent ==
Released on bail, he died in 2004 of lung cancer without his legal case reaching a conclusion. Six years after his death, in 2010, Slimani was posthumously exonerated, all charges were dropped and an official apology for his ordeals was issued.

== Personal life ==
Slimani was married to an otorhinolaryngologist Béatrice-Najat Dhobb-Slimani; one of his three daughters is the French-Moroccan writer Leïla Slimani.

Slimani was very interested in the arts and sports. He had been a friend of the Moroccan painter Mohamed Bennani for 30 years and he was among the first who acquired a work of the painter Chaïbia Talal. In 1976, the year in which Morocco won the Africa Cup, he was president of the Royal Moroccan Football Federation.
