= Moulay Rachid (district) =

Moulay Rachid مولاي رشيد
- District of Casablanca
- Interactive map of Moulay Rachid
- Coordinates: 33°34′13″N 7°32′31″W
- Country: Morocco
- Region: Casablanca-Settat

Area
  - Total: 13.38 km^{2} (5.17 sq mi)

Population (2004)
  - Total: 384,044
- Time zone: UTC+0 (WET)
  - Summer (DST): UTC+1 (WEST)

Moulay Rachid (مولاي رشيد) is a district and southeastern suburb of Casablanca, in the Casablanca-Settat region of Morocco. The district, named after Prince Moulay Rachid of Morocco, covers an area of 13.38 square kilometres (5.7 square miles) and as of 2004 had 384,044 inhabitants. It lies to the east of Sbata.

== Subdivisions ==
The district is divided into two arrondissements:

- Moulay Rachid
- Sidi Othmane
