= La Mamounia =

Hotel in Marrakesh, Morocco

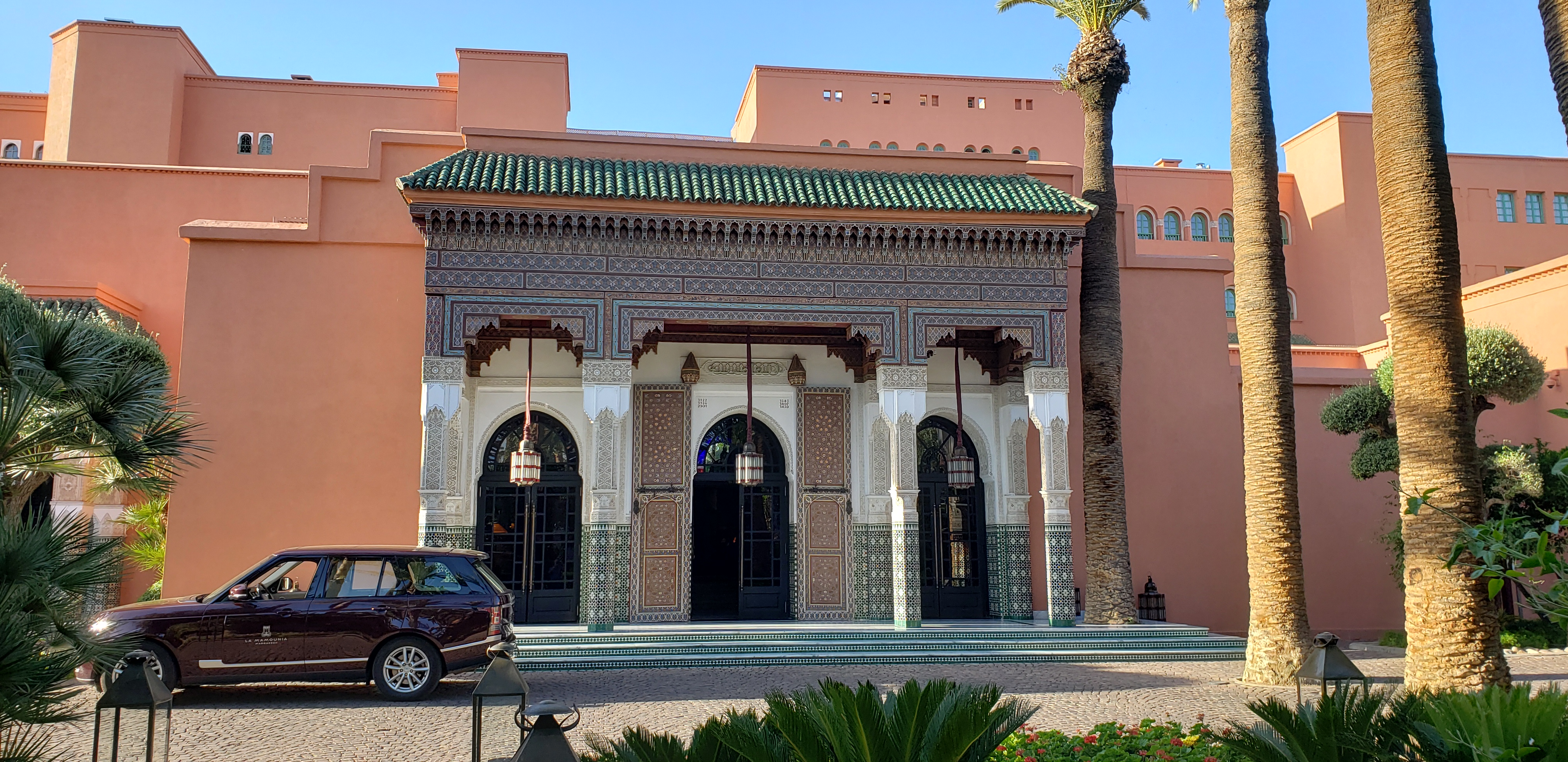
- La Mamounia entrance
- Interactive map of the La Mamounia area

General information
- Architectural style: Moroccan architecture and Art Deco
- Location: Avenue Bab Jdid, 40 040 Marrakesh, Morocco
- Coordinates: 31°37′15″N 7°59′50″W
- Completed: 1929; 97 years ago

Design and construction
- Architect: Henri Prost; Antoine Marchisio

La Mamounia (French: [la mamunja]; Arabic: مامونية) is a five-star hotel in Marrakesh, Morocco, opposite the Kutubiyya Mosque. Widely regarded as one of the best hotels globally, La Mamounia has been named the best hotel in the world by Condé Nast Traveler. It is marketed by The Leading Hotels of the World. Mamounia means 'safe haven' or 'reservoir' in the Arabic language.

The hotel has 135 rooms (with each room covering 30 to 45 square metres or 320 to 480 square feet), 71 suites (with each suite covering 55 to 212 square metres or 590 to 2,280 square feet), and 3 riads (with each covering 700 square metres or 7,500 square feet) for rent.

Notable guests have included politicians such as Charles de Gaulle, Winston Churchill, Franklin D. Roosevelt, Nelson Mandela, Ronald Reagan, and Helmut Kohl; entertainment industry stars include Kirk Douglas, Paul McCartney, Charlie Chaplin, and Omar Sharif; athletes such as Zinedine Zidane; fashion designer Yves Saint Laurent, Marlene Dietrich, Gary Cooper and artist Andy Warhol.

== History ==
The hotel was conceived in 1923 by architects Henri Prost and Antoine Marchisio on the 15-hectare (37-acre) palace and garden that Sultan Mohammed ben Abdallah gave to his son, Moulay Mamoun in the 18th century. The hotel opened in 1929 and combines Moroccan architecture with the Art Deco style.

In a 1935 letter to his wife, Winston Churchill wrote about the hotel; "This is a wonderful place, and the hotel is one of the best I have ever used". One of the bars at the hotel is now named after Churchill.

La Mamounia was a filming location for Alfred Hitchcock's film The Man Who Knew Too Much, starring James Stewart and Doris Day in 1956.

"Mamunia" was written by Paul McCartney in 1973 while staying at the hotel.

Pianist Randy Weston recorded Marrakech: In the Cool of the Evening at the hotel during a vacation in 1992.

In September 2009, the hotel reopened after being closed for a 3-year renovation. The renovation was led by designer Jacques Garcia. It added more reds, yellow and black colors to the design as well as LED displays to be used for advertising. The removal of a number of original features during this renovation was criticized.

From 2010 to 2015, the hotel offered the La Mamounia literary award, a Moroccan literary prize of 200,000 Moroccan dirhams.

In 2019, the government of Morocco announced that state-owned railway company ONCF would sell a 60% stake it owned in the hotel in a privatization deal to cut its debt.

In 2020, the mansion, its four restaurants, four bars, and various pavilions were renovated. Chefs Pierre Hermé and Jean-Georges Vongerichten each redesigned one of the restaurants.

== Facilities ==
The riads are each composed of three bathrooms, salons, private swimming pools and terraces. It has signature restaurants by chefs Pierre Hermé and Jean-Georges Vongerichten. The hotel also includes a 8.1-hectare (20-acre) garden, colonnaded courtyards, a spa, and a health club in a glass cube.

== Gallery ==
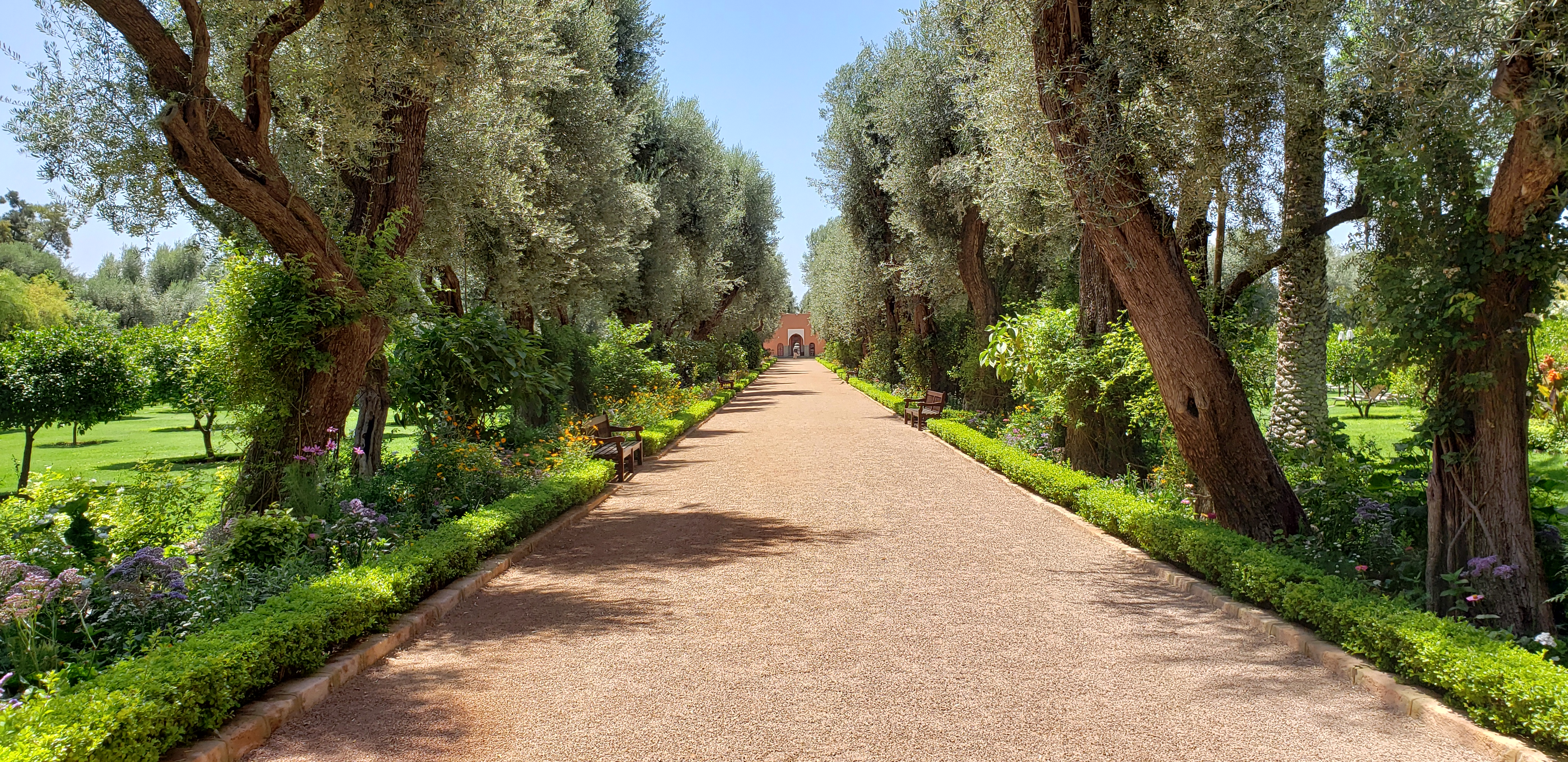
La Mamounia Garden

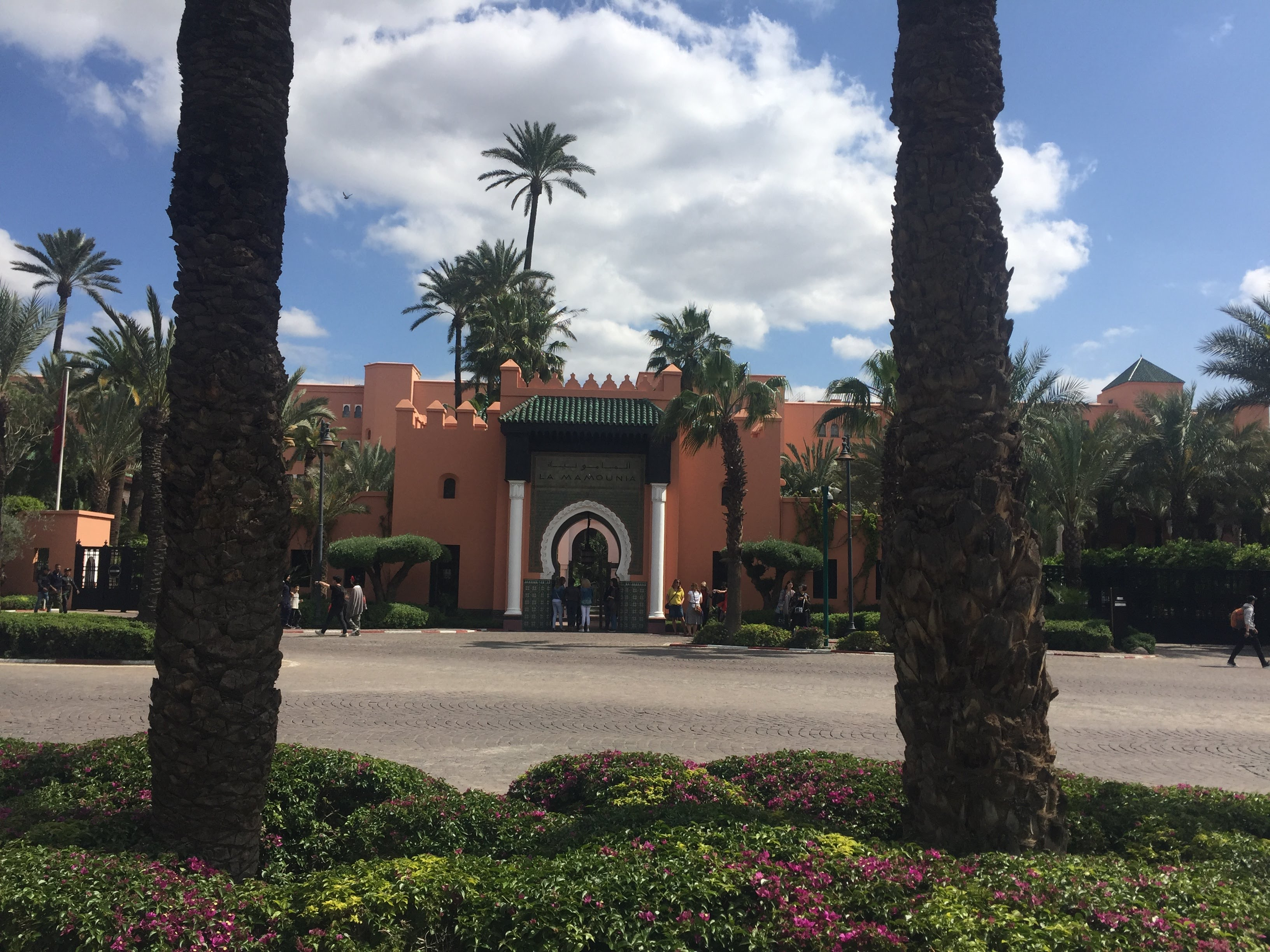
Hotel entrance

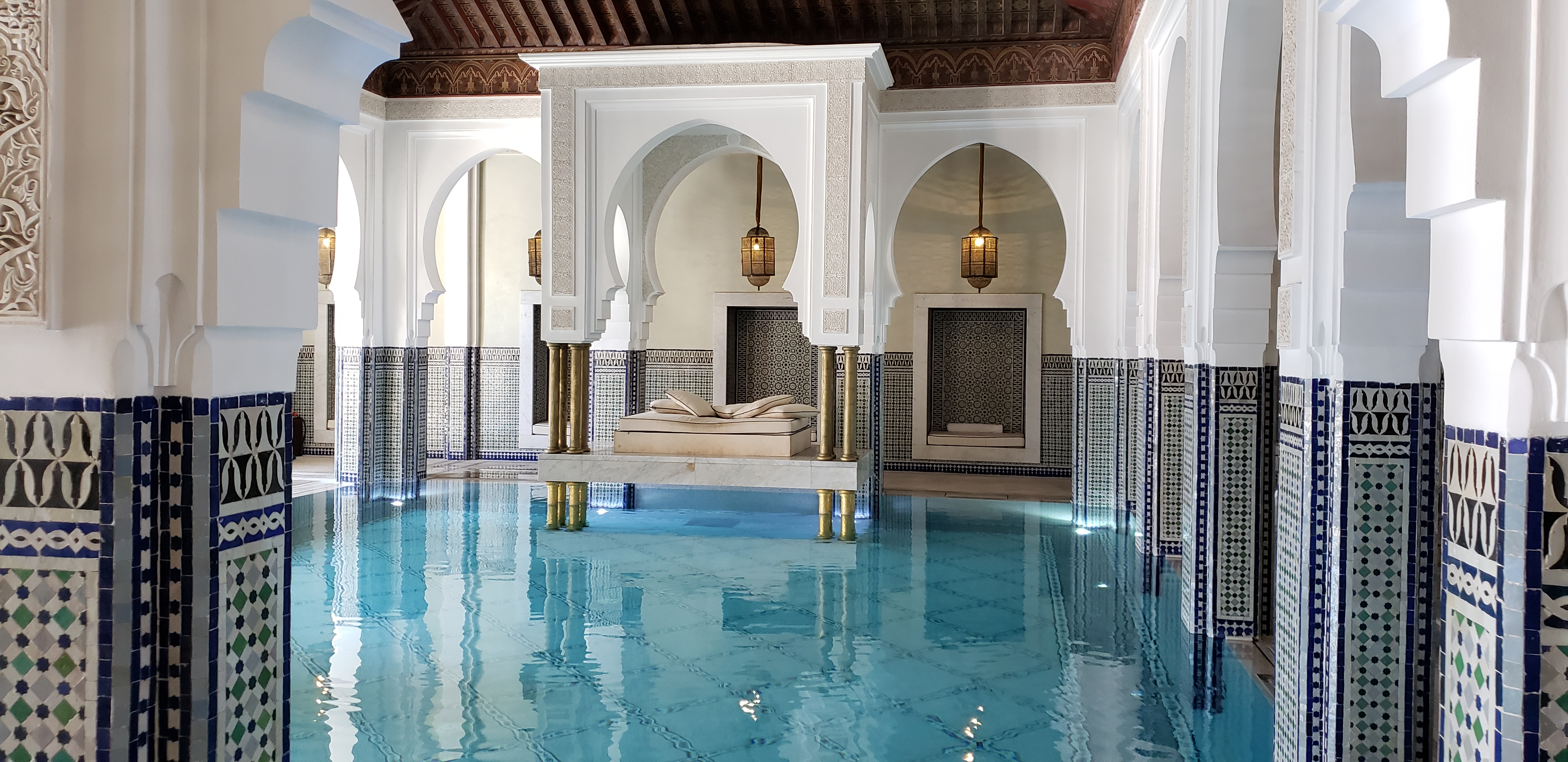
Indoor pool

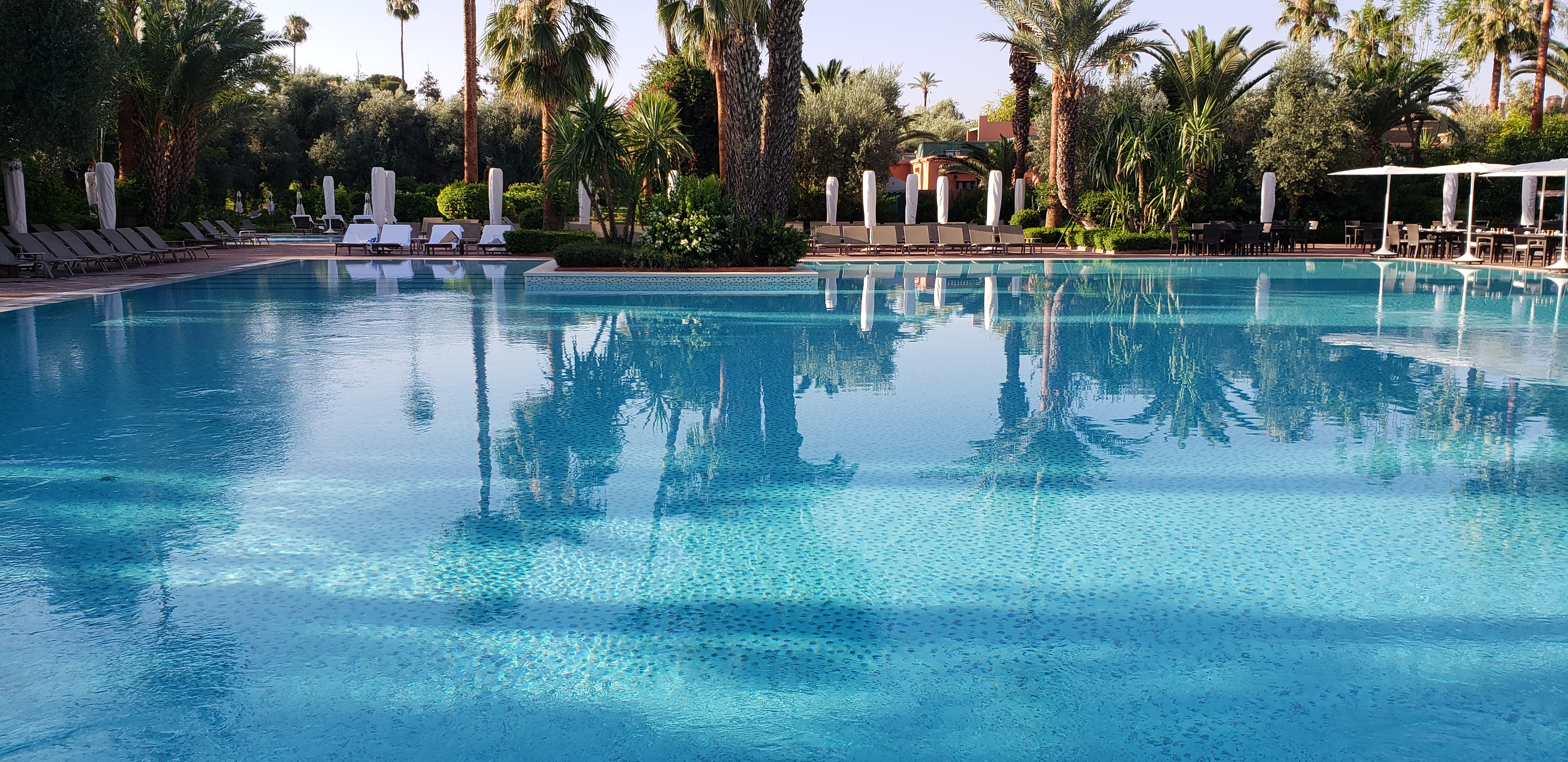
Outdoor pool

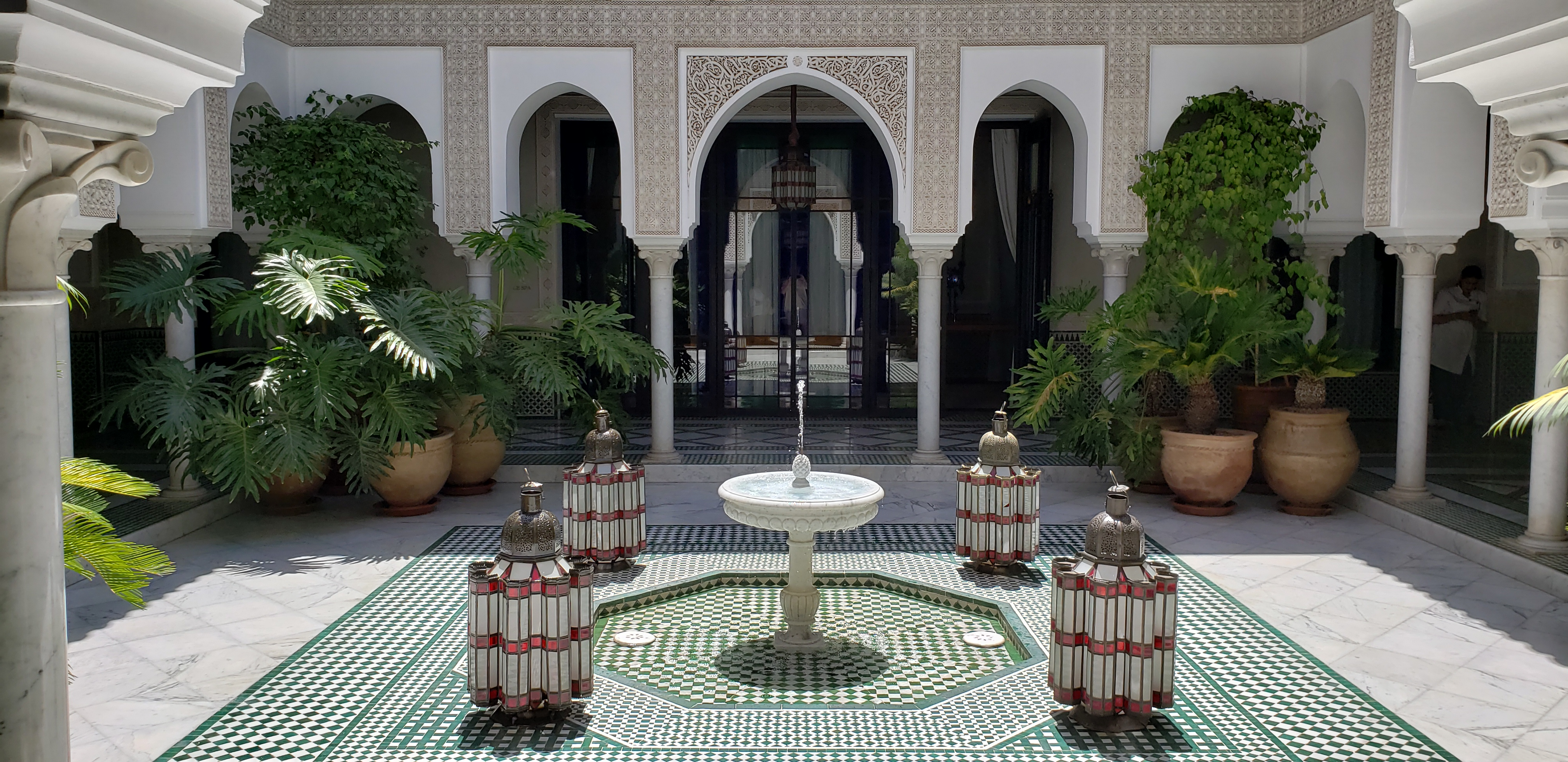
Courtyard

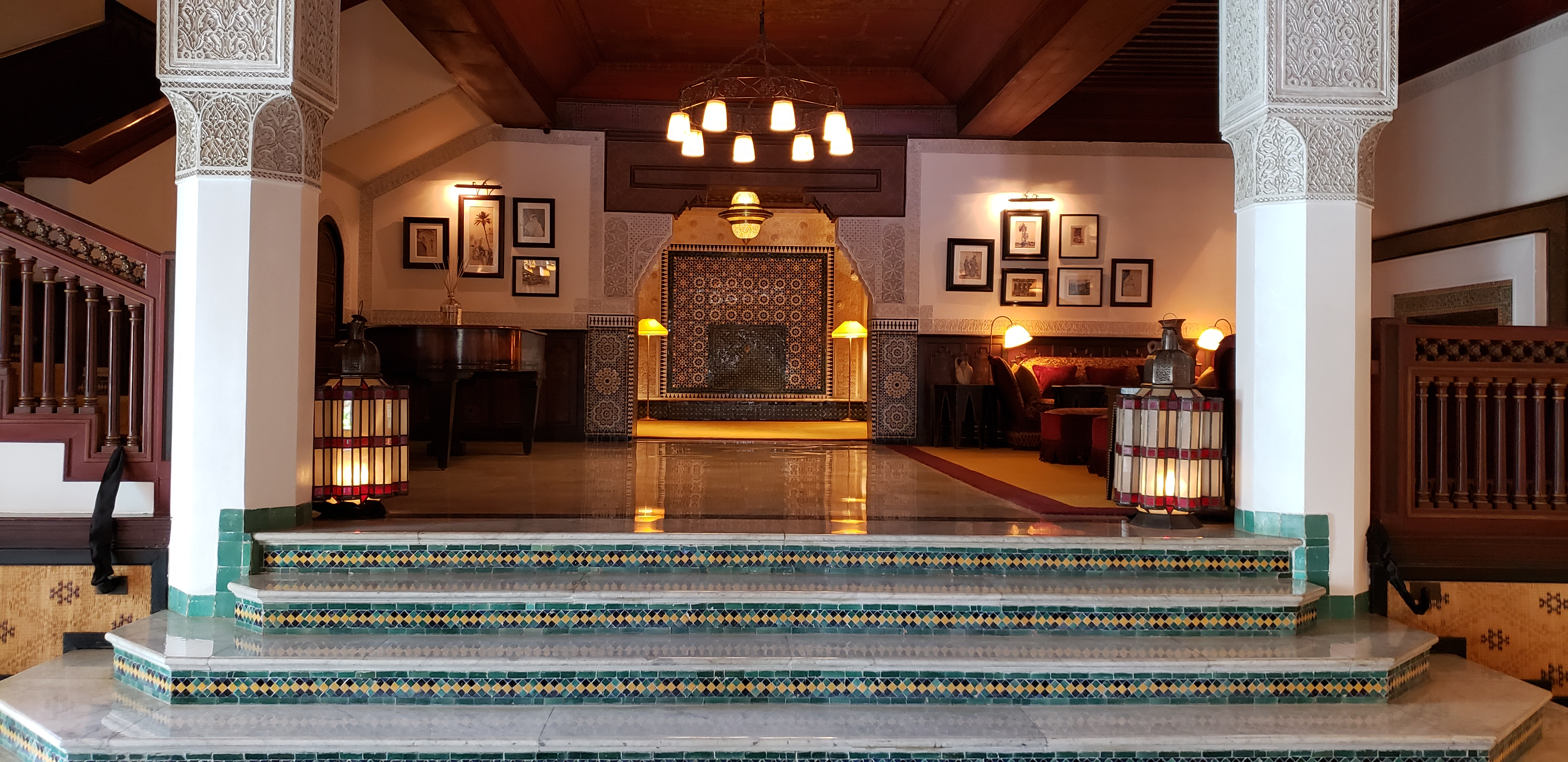
Lobby

== See also ==
- La Mamounia literary award
