= Jamal Aghmani =

Moroccan politician

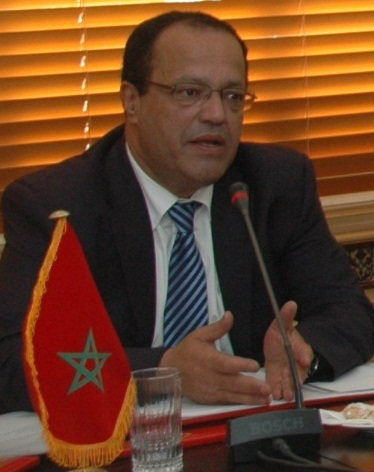

Minister of Employment and Vocational Training
- In office 19 September 2007 – 3 January 2012
- Monarch: Mohammed VI
- Prime Minister: Abbas El Fassi
- Preceded by: Mustapha Mansouri
- Succeeded by: Abdelouahed Souhail

Personal details
- Born: 1958 (age 67–68) Rabat, Morocco
- Party: USFP
- Education: University of Mohammad V
- Occupation: Politician

Jamal Aghmani or Rhmani (Arabic: جمال أغماني; born 1958, Rabat) is a Moroccan politician of the Socialist Union of Popular Forces party. Between 2007 and 2012, he held the position of Minister of Employment and Vocational Training in the cabinet of Abbas El Fassi. He has a bachelor's in social science from the University of Mohammed V and was a professor at the same institution before becoming minister.

== See also ==
- Cabinet of Morocco
