= Hiller B. Zobel =

American judge (born 1932)

Hiller B. Zobel is a retired Associate Justice of the Superior Court of Massachusetts and author or coauthor of several books on various legal topics, including the Boston Massacre and John Adams. He graduated from Harvard College in 1953 and received his law degree in 1959 from Harvard. He was recalled from retirement in 2006 to serve on the Middlesex Superior Court.

Some of the legal tasks in which he played a significant role include:

- Judge at the murder trial of Louise Woodward, British au pair in 1997.
- Libel counsel for WCVB-TV
- Professor at Boston College Law School.

== Selected publications ==
- Zobel, Hiller B., The Boston Massacre (1970) (reissued 1995), W. W. Norton and Co., ISBN 978-0393314830.
- Zobel, Hiller B., Rous, Stephen N., Doctors and the Law: Defendants and Expert Witnesses (1993), W. W. Norton & Company, ISBN 978-0393034509.
- Wroth, L. Kinvin (editor), Zobel, Hiller B. (editor), Legal Papers of John Adams (3 vols) (1965), Harvard University OCLC 1034100, 1034247, 860506129
