= Leïla Slimani =

Franco-Moroccan writer (born 1981)

- ليلى السليماني
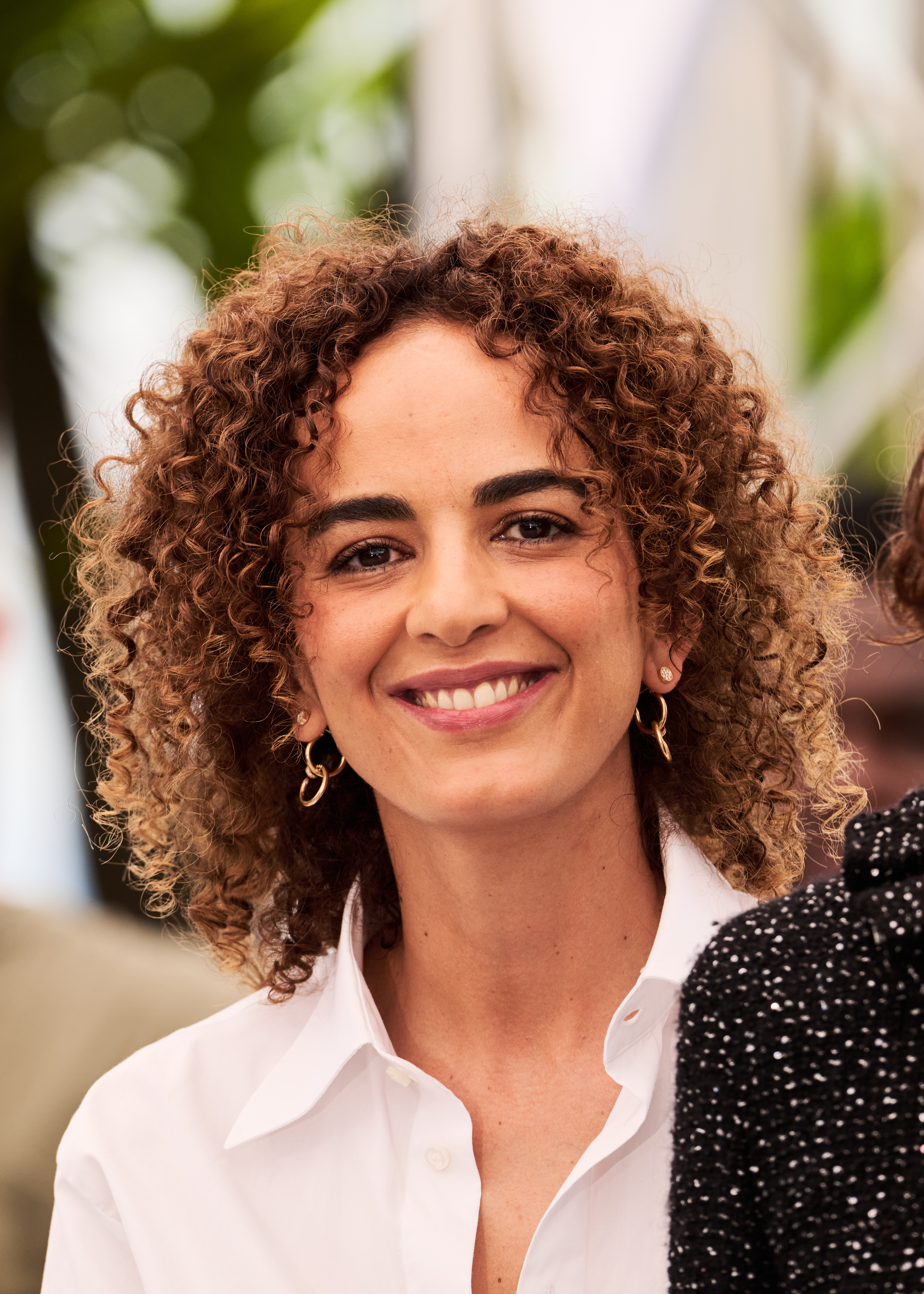
- Leïla Slimani in 2025
- Born: 3 October 1981 (age 45); Rabat, Morocco
- Education: Sciences Po; ESCP Europe
- Occupations: Author; journalist
- Known for: Lullaby (novel)
- Children: 2
- Parent(s): Othman Slimani (father); Béatrice-Najat Dhobb (mother)
- Awards: Prix Goncourt (2016)

Leïla Slimani (born 3 October 1981) is a French-Moroccan writer and journalist. She is also a French diplomat in her capacity as the personal representative of the French president Emmanuel Macron to the Organisation internationale de la Francophonie. In 2016, she was awarded the Prix Goncourt for her novel Chanson douce.

== Life ==
Slimani's maternal grandmother Anne Dhobb (née Ruetsch; 1921–2016) grew up in Alsace. In 1944, she met her future husband Lakhdar Dhobb, a Moroccan colonel in the French Colonial Army, during the liberation of France. After the war she followed him back to Morocco, where they lived in Meknes. Anne Dhobb's autobiographical novel was published in 2003; she became the first writer in the family. Her daughter (Slimani's mother) is Béatrice-Najat Dhobb-Slimani, an otolaryngologist, who married the French-educated Moroccan economist Othman Slimani. The couple had three daughters; Leïla Slimani is the middle one.

Leïla was born in Rabat on 3 October 1981; she grew up in a liberal, French-speaking household and attended French schools. An important rupture in Slimani's childhood occurred in 1993 when her father was falsely implicated in a finance scandal and fired from his position as president of the CIH Bank (he was later officially exonerated.).

Slimani left Morocco at the age of 17 for Paris to study political science and media studies at the Sciences Po and ESCP Europe. After her graduation, she temporarily considered a career as an actress, completing an acting course and appearing in supporting roles in two films. On 24 April 2008 she married Antoine d’Engremont, a Parisian banker, whom she first met in 2005 and started to work as a journalist for the magazine Jeune Afrique in October of that year. The work required much travel. After her son was born in 2011 and she was arrested in Tunisia while reporting on the Arab Spring, she decided to quit her job at Jeune Afrique to pursue freelance work and write a novel instead. The novel, however, was rejected by publishers. In 2013, Slimani took a writing workshop by Jean-Marie Laclavetine, a novelist and editor at Gallimard. He took an interest in Slimani's writing and helped her improve her style; in 2014, Slimani published her first novel Dans le jardin de l’ogre ("In the Garden of the Ogre" - in English translation, "Adèle") with Gallimard. The novel fared well with French critics and received the La Mamounia literary award in Morocco. Two years later she followed up with the psychological thriller Chanson douce, which won the Prix Goncourt and turned her into a literary star in France, and made her known to international audiences as well. In 2017, her second child, a daughter, was born.

In addition to her native Moroccan citizenship, Slimani also holds French citizenship due to her Alsatian heritage. In 2017, she was made an Officier of the Ordre des Arts et des Lettres by the French government. Since 2021, she has been living in Lisbon, Portugal.

In August 2022, she was announced as the chair of judges for the International Booker Prize 2023.

== Work ==
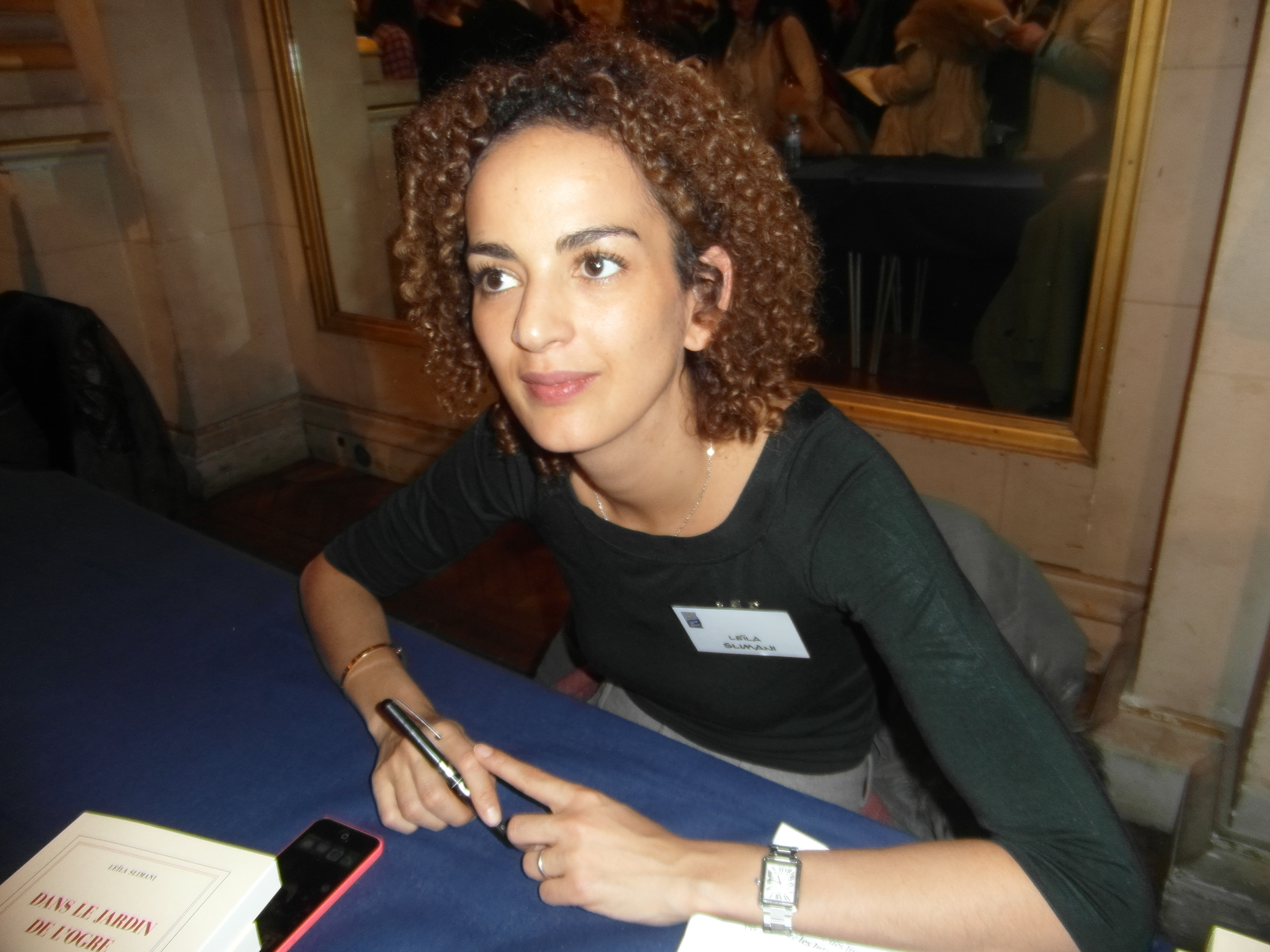
Slimani in 2015

=== Politics ===
On 6 November 2017 the president of France, Emmanuel Macron, appointed Leila Slimani his personal representative to the Organisation internationale de la Francophonie.

=== Fiction ===
==== Adèle ====
Slimani's first novel Dans le jardin de l’ogre, published in English as Adèle, tells the story of a woman who loses control of her life due to her sexual addiction. Slimani got the idea for her story after seeing the Dominique Strauss-Kahn unfolding news. The novel fared well with French critics; in Morocco it received the La Mamounia literary award.

==== Lullaby/The Perfect Nanny ====
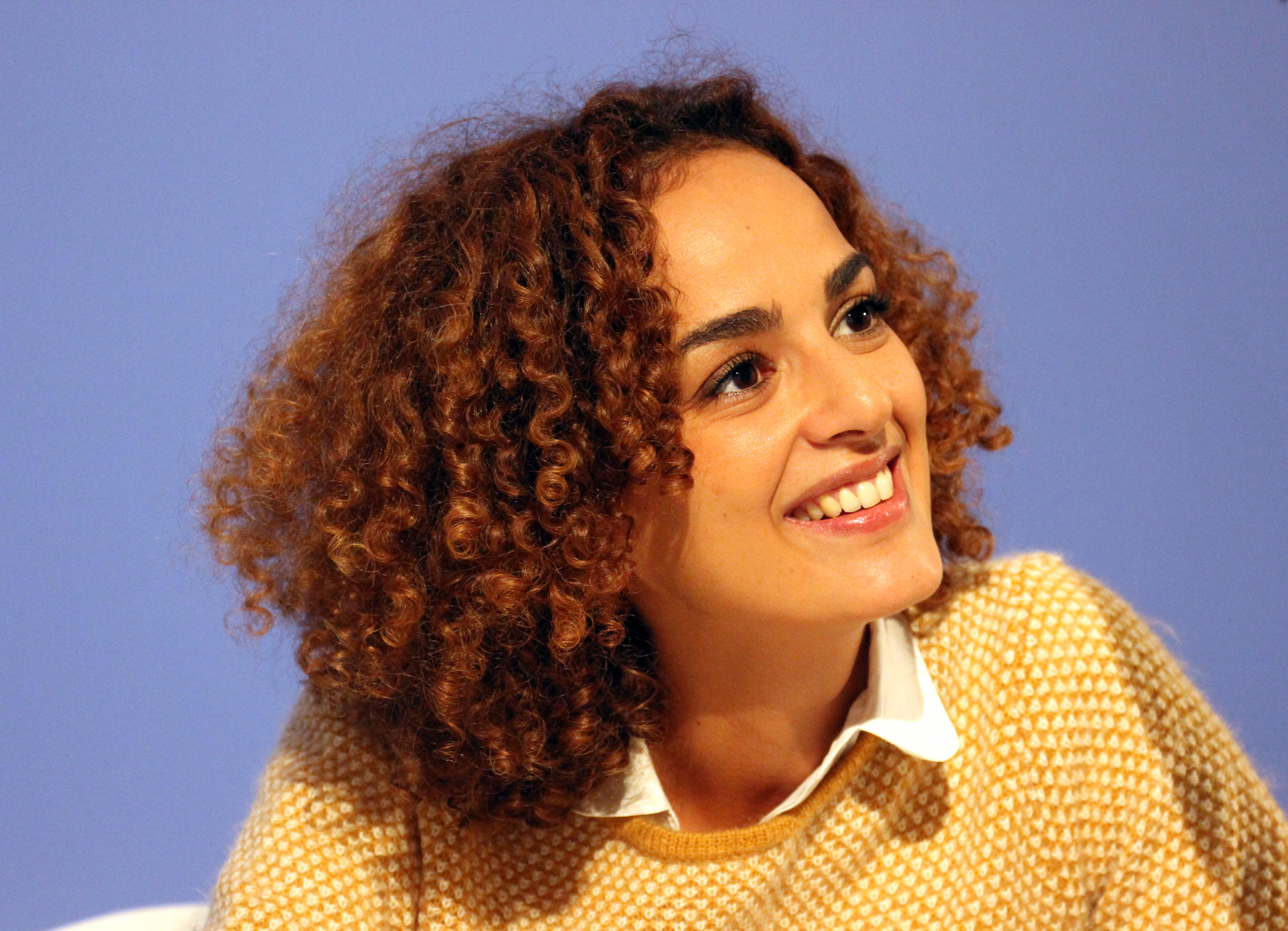
Leïla Slimani in 2017

Chanson douce (lit. "sweet song") is the story of a double murder of two young siblings by their nanny, inspired by the killing by a nanny of the Krim children in Manhattan in 2012. The novel starts off with the immediate aftermath of the murder with the opening line of "The baby is dead", and then recounts the backstory of the parents, a liberal, upper middle class Parisian couple, as well as their nanny, who is economically and psychologically struggling. Slimani named the nanny Louise after Louise Woodward, a British au pair in the US who was convicted of involuntary manslaughter of the toddler in her care. The novel was well received by French critics. It quickly turned into a bestseller, with over 76,000 copies printed within three months even before the book was awarded the Prix Goncourt in 2016. It subsequently became the most read book in France that year with over 450,000 copies printed; by the end of 2017 around 600,000 copies had been sold in France. It has been translated into 18 languages, with 17 more to come; the English translation (by Sam Taylor) of her novel was published in 2018 as The Perfect Nanny in the US and as Lullaby in the UK. In 2019, Lullaby won a British Book Award in the "Début Book of the Year" category.

==== Le pays des autres ====
Le pays des autres, lit. "The country of the others" (at Gallimard, 2020), a first novel in a trilogy about the writer's own family, deals with the life of Slimani's maternal grandparents during Morocco's period of decolonisation in the 1950s. The second volume in the trilogy, Regardez-nous danser (lit. "Look at us dance"), was published in 2022, and the third, J'emporterai le feu, in January 2025.

=== Non-fiction ===
Slimani worked for several years as a journalist reporting on Northern Africa and the Maghreb, covering, among other things, the Arab Spring in 2011.

Her book Sexe et Mensonges: La Vie Sexuelle au Maroc ("Sex and Lies: Sex Life in Morocco") compiles the accounts of many women she had interviewed while on a book tour throughout Morocco.

La baie de Dakhla : itinérance enchantée entre mer et désert describes a region of Morocco on the Atlantic where people are going through a period of transition between traditional life and modernity.

=== Books ===
- La baie de Dakhla : itinérance enchantée entre mer et désert. Casablanca: Malika Editions. 2013. ISBN 9789954037669. OCLC 889653067.
- Dans le jardin de l'ogre. Paris: Éditions Gallimard. 2014. ISBN 9782070146239. OCLC 889705369.
  English edition: Adele: A Novel, translated by Sam Taylor, Penguin, 2019 ISBN 978-0143132189
- Chanson douce. Paris: Éditions Gallimard. 2016. ISBN 9782070196678. OCLC 957971440.
  US edition: The Perfect Nanny. Penguin Random House. 2018. ISBN 978-0-143-13217-2.
  UK edition: Lullaby. Translated by Sam Taylor. Faber & Faber. 2018. ISBN 978-0-571-33753-8.
- Le diable est dans les détails. Éditions de l'Aube. 2016. ISBN 9782815921442.
- Sexe et mensonges : La vie sexuelle au Maroc. Les Arènes, Paris, 2017 ISBN 978-2-35204-568-7
  UK edition: Sex and Lies. Translated by Sophie Lewis. Faber & Faber. 2020. ISBN 9780571355037.
- Paroles d'honneur. Les Arènes, Paris, 2017, ISBN 978-2-35204-654-7, illustrated by Laetitia Coryn
- Le pays des autres. Gallimard, March 2020, ISBN 2072887992, in French
  UK edition: The country of others. Translated by Sam Taylor. Faber & Faber. 2022. ISBN 978-0571361632
  US edition: In the country of others. Penguin Books. 2022. ISBN 978-0143135982
- Regardez-nous danser. Gallimard, February 2022, ISBN 9782072972553, in French
  UK edition: Watch Us Dance. Translated by Sam Taylor. Faber & Faber. 2024. ISBN 978-0571376087
- J'emporterai le feu. Gallimard, January 2025, ISBN 9782073098368, in French
  UK edition: I'll Take the Fire. Translated by Sam Taylor. Faber & Faber. 2026. ISBN 9780571395347
- Assaut contre la frontière. Gallimard, March 2026. ISBN 978-2073152930, in French
