= Abdelouahed Souhail =

Moroccan politician

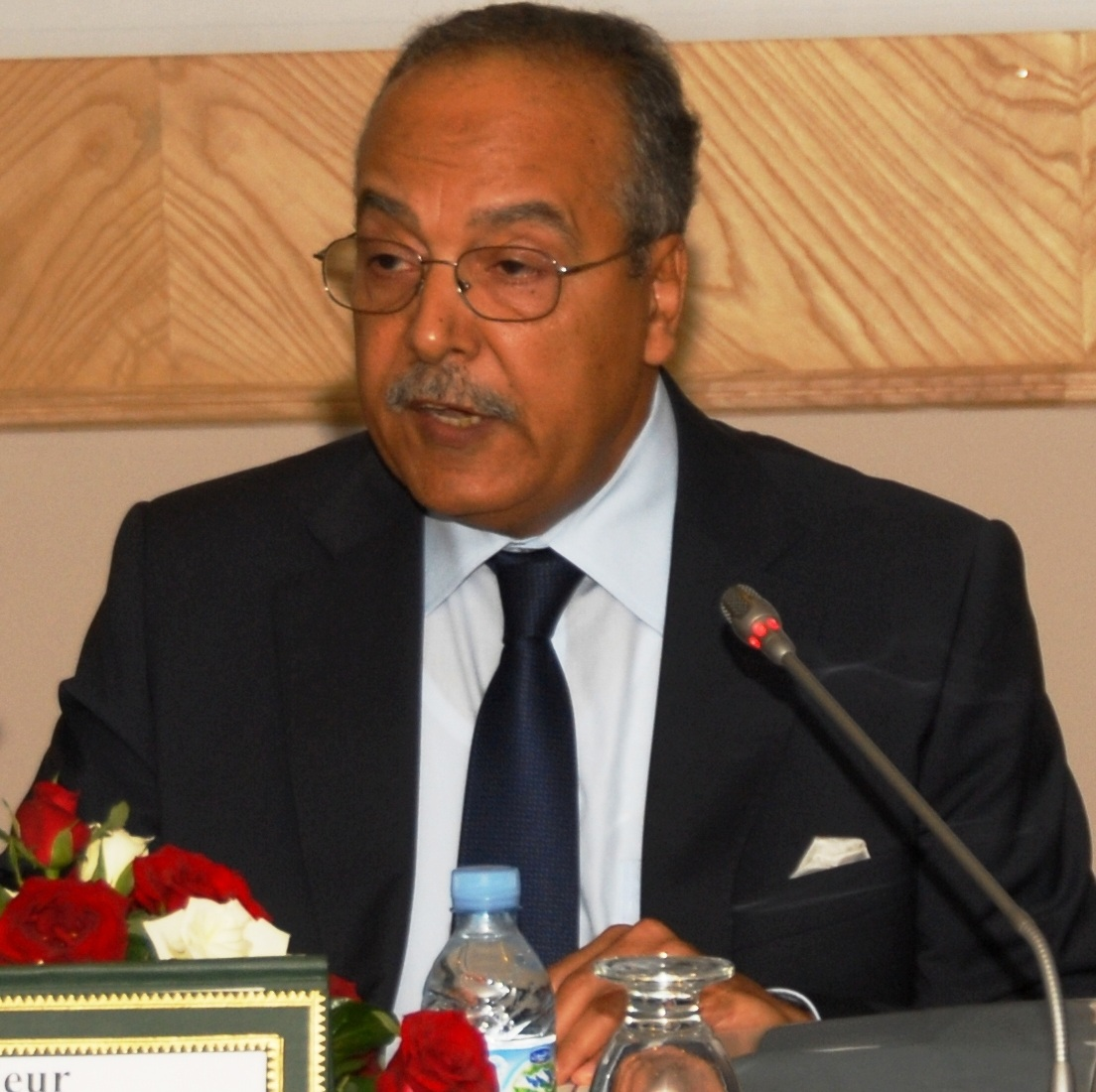

Minister of Employment and Vocational Training
- Incumbent
- Assumed office 3 January 2012
- Monarch: Mohammed VI
- Prime Minister: Abdelilah Benkirane
- Preceded by: Jamal Aghmani

CEO of CIH Bank
- In office 9 February 1998 – 21 July 2004
- Succeeded by: Khalid Alioua

Personal details
- Born: 1946 (age 79–80)
- Party: Party of Progress and Socialism
- Occupation: Politician

Abdelouahed Souhail (Arabic: عبد الواحد سهيل - born 1946, Casablanca) is a Moroccan politician of the Party of Progress and Socialism. Since 3 January 2012, he holds the position of Minister of Employment and Vocational Training in Abdelilah Benkirane's government. On 9 February 1998, he was appointed by King Hassan II as the CEO of the CIH Bank (French: Crédit Immobilier et Hôtelier), a position he held until 2004.

== See also ==
- Cabinet of Morocco
