= Louise Woodward case =

American criminal case of 1997 baby death by British au pair

Killing of Matthew Eappen
- Location: Newton, Massachusetts, U.S.
- Date: 9 February 1997; 29 years ago
- Attack type: Child homicide by blunt trauma, infanticide
- Victims: Matthew Eappen, age eight months
- Charges: First-degree murder
- Verdict: Guilty on the lesser offense of second-degree murder; Conviction reduced to involuntary manslaughter by trial judge
- Convictions: Involuntary manslaughter
- Sentence: 9 months and 9 days in prison; reduced from life imprisonment with the possibility of parole after 15 years
- Convicted: Louise Woodward
- Judge: Hiller B. Zobel

Louise Woodward, born in 1978 (age 47–48), is a British former au pair, who at the age of 18 was charged with murder, but was subsequently convicted of involuntary manslaughter (reduced from the jury trial verdict) of eight-month-old baby Matthew Eappen, in Newton, Massachusetts, United States.

Eappen died from a fractured skull and subdural hematoma, and had a previously unnoticed fractured wrist. Although Woodward was initially found guilty of second-degree murder, Judge Hiller B. Zobel reduced her conviction to involuntary manslaughter during a post-conviction relief hearing, leading to her release after serving 279 days.

After her return to the United Kingdom, she began a career in law, and later as a ballroom and Latin dance teacher. In 2022, a Channel 4 documentary revisited the case, with a civil rights lawyer questioning the validity of the 'shaken baby syndrome' accusation.

== Background ==
Five days after being admitted to Children's Hospital in Boston, Matthew Eappen fell into a coma and, after being removed from life support, died on 9 February 1997, as a result of a fractured skull and subdural hematoma. He was also found to have a fractured wrist, an unnoticed and unexplained injury from a month earlier. Lois E.H. Smith, an ophthalmologist at the hospital, observed retinal hemorrhages judged characteristic of shaken baby syndrome.

Woodward was arrested by police on 5 February, and held for assault and battery initially, then murder when Matthew died. In a statement to the police, Woodward said that she "popped the baby on the bed", which she said at trial meant the same as "laid" the baby on the bed. However, a police officer testified that Woodward had said she was rough with the child and dropped him twice that day.

A grand jury decided on a first-degree murder charge in March. She was denied bail and held until trial at the Massachusetts Correctional Institution – Framingham, a maximum-security prison. Before the trial, the defense tried to move it to another city, arguing that a local jury would be too biased to render a fair verdict. The judge disagreed and denied the defense motion.

== Polygraph testing ==
Before her trial on 7 May 1997, Woodward decided to undergo a polygraph examination conducted by David C. Raskin, a polygraph examiner hired by her own lawyers. During the course of the examination, she was asked questions about whether she caused injury to Matthew while he was in her care on 4 February 1997. She denied having caused any injuries to him, and Raskin concluded that her answers to these questions were truthful to a confidence level of 95 percent. Raskin's results were evaluated by Charles Honts, another polygrapher hired by her defense lawyers, who also claimed that she had answered truthfully when responding to relevant questions about whether she had injured him.

== Trial ==
The presiding judge was Hiller B. Zobel. The prosecution, led by Assistant District Attorney Gerard Leone, along with Assistant District Attorney Martha Coakley, presented eight physicians involved in Matthew's care, including a neurosurgeon, an ophthalmologist, a radiologist, two pathologists, and an expert in child abuse, who testified to their belief that his injuries had occurred as a result of violent shaking, and from his head impacting with a hard surface. The defense challenged this, among other things, on the grounds that he had no neck injuries; injuries that they claimed would have been expected if he had been violently shaken. The prosecution had also claimed initially that his impact injuries were the equivalent of having been thrown from a two-story building, but they equivocated over this claim as the trial progressed. The defense presented expert medical testimony that his injury may have occurred three weeks before the date of death, implying that his parents, Sunil and Deborah Eappen, both of whom were doctors, might be implicated in negligence or abuse of the child. He had old wrist injuries that may have been incurred before Woodward even arrived at the house. She, however, claimed under cross-examination that she never noticed any slight bumps, marks, or any unusual behaviour by him at any time prior to the night he was taken to the hospital.

The lead counsel at Woodward's trial, and the architect of her medical and forensic defense, was Barry Scheck, co-founder of the Innocence Project. Scheck was hired and paid for by her employer EF Education First's Cultural Care Au Pair. As part of the defense strategy, her attorneys requested that the jury not be given the option of convicting her of manslaughter (a lesser included offense), and instead either convict her of murder or find her not guilty. When personally questioned about this decision by the judge, she agreed with her lawyers. Legal experts speculated that the motivation for this strategy was to help EF Education First avoid a civil lawsuit from the Eappens. EF's screening process and training for au pairs had come under scrutiny; she had only received three days of training. If the death had been pre-meditated, then under Massachusetts law, EF Education First could not be held responsible. However, if the death was not pre-meditated, then it would indicate fault with EF Education First's Cultural Care Au Pair.

On 30 October 1997, after 26 hours of deliberations, the jury found her guilty of second-degree murder. The following day, Judge Zobel sentenced her to life in prison with a minimum of 15 years to be served.

== Appeal ==
Woodward's legal team filed post-conviction motions to the trial court, and the hearing opened on 4 November. In the days following the verdict, it emerged that the jury had been split about the murder charge, but those who had favoured an acquittal were persuaded to accept a conviction. However, this was of no legal consequence. One juror claimed that none of the jury "thought she tried to murder him".

On 10 November, at a post-conviction relief hearing, Judge Zobel reduced the conviction to involuntary manslaughter, stating that "the circumstances in which the defendant acted were characterised by confusion, inexperience, frustration, immaturity and some anger, but not malice in the legal sense supporting a conviction for second-degree murder", adding: "I am morally certain that allowing this defendant on this evidence to remain convicted of second-degree murder would be a miscarriage of justice".

Woodward's sentence was reduced to time served (279 days) and she was freed. Assistant District Attorney Gerard Leone then appealed the judge's decision to the Supreme Judicial Court of Massachusetts. Woodward's lawyers also asked the court to throw out her manslaughter conviction. The court affirmed the guilty verdict by a 7–0 vote. However, in a 4–3 split decision, the court rejected the prosecution's appeal against the reduction of the conviction to involuntary manslaughter, and the sentence, on 16 June 1998. Woodward then returned to the United Kingdom.

== Aftermath ==
On returning home, Woodward gave a press conference, which was broadcast live in the UK and the U.S. She said that she would be giving an interview to the BBC, for no money, and wanted to return to her life. The interview was conducted by Martin Bashir in a special edition of the flagship BBC programme Panorama, in which she maintained her innocence. In a later interview, Woodward admitted to "lightly shaking" the baby, an action recommended by the National Institutes of Health.

Matthew's parents filed a civil lawsuit to prevent Woodward from earning any profits from selling her story. In July 1998, she lost the lawsuit by default as her legal costs were no longer covered by the au pair agency. In January 1999, a settlement was agreed to which barred Woodward from profiting from Matthew's death.

Woodward studied law at London South Bank University, where she graduated with a 2:2 (Hons) degree in July 2002. In 2004, she began a training contract (mandatory work experience at an accredited firm that aspiring solicitors must serve) with the law firm North Ainley Halliwell, in Oldham, Greater Manchester. However, she dropped out of her training contract the following year in order to pursue a career as a ballroom and Latin dance teacher in Chester. She and her husband have a daughter, born in 2014.

In 2007 Woodward was named the 'most notorious criminal convicted in Massachusetts' by Boston law magazine Exhibit A.

The conviction had a side effect of defeating legislation in Massachusetts to restore capital punishment, when in November 1997, the Massachusetts House of Representatives deadlocked 80–80 on a bill to restart the practice; Rep. John P. Slattery said he had changed his mind from support to opposition after the case, saying he did not "want to be the one lying in bed some night wondering if the wrong person is being put to death".

Patrick Barnes, a paediatric radiologist at Stanford University, was a key prosecution witness in the trial, but in 2011, said he would not give the same testimony today. He said there had been a revolution in the understanding of head injuries in the past decade, partly due to advances in MRI brain scanning technology: "We started realizing there were a number of medical conditions that can affect a baby's brain and look like the findings that we used to attribute to shaken baby syndrome or child abuse", such as infections and in utero strokes.

In 2022, Channel 4 in the UK broadcast a documentary called The Killer Nanny: Did She Do It?, which looked at the case from both prosecution and defence perspectives. In it, civil rights lawyer Clive Stafford Smith stated that "shaken baby syndrome is bullshit".

Boston-based pediatrician and child abuse expert Eli Newberger, who treated Matthew and who was also a key prosecution witness in Woodward's trial, died in 2024.

In July 2026, it was reported that HBO had ordered The Trial of Louise Woodward, a five-part scripted limited series about the case. Matthew Barry serves as creator and writer of the series, with Susanne Bier directing all episodes. Meghann Fahy and Sagar Radia are set to play Deborah and Sunil Eappen respectively, while Catriona Chandler stars as Louise Woodward.

== See also ==
- Death of Kristie Fischer
- Murder of Krim siblings – in which a nanny was convicted of killing two children in her care

== Bibliography ==
- Timmermans, Stefan (2008). Postmortem – How Medical Examiners Explain Suspicious Deaths, Ch 3 "Forensic credibility at the 'Nanny Trial'". University of Chicago Press. ISBN 978-0226804002.
