= CIH Bank =

Moroccan retail banking institution

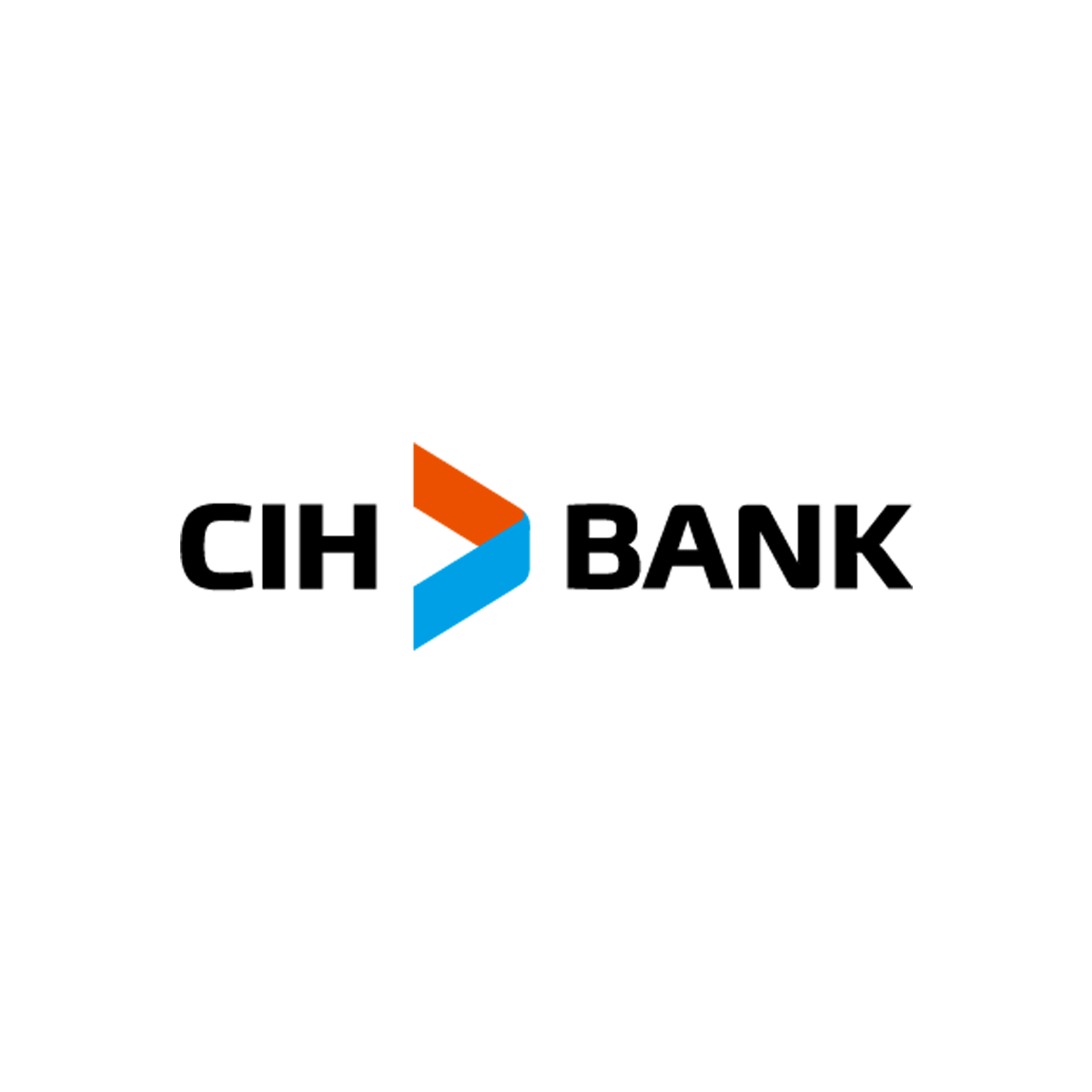
- Formerly: Caisse de Prêts Immobiliers du Maroc (until 1967); Crédit Immobilier et Hôtelier
- Company type: Société anonyme
- Traded as: CSE: CIH
- Founded: 1920; 106 years ago
- Headquarters: Casablanca, Morocco
- Key people: Lotfi Sekkat (president and managing director)
- Services: Investment banking Retail banking
- Operating income: ▲MAD 1,381 billion (2007)
- Net income: ▲34.4 million US$ (2016)
- Total equity: MAD 2.3 billion
- Owner: Massira Capital: 55,66%; floating stock: 16,37%; Holmarcom Group: 11,73%; CDG: 6,69%; RCAR: 5,21%
- Number of employees: 1,542
- Website: cihbank.ma

CIH Bank, formerly Crédit Immobilier et Hôtelier, is a Moroccan bank based in Casablanca. Originally focused on financing the real estate and hospitality sectors, the bank has since expanded its operations to become a universal banking institution, offering a full range of financial services to both individuals and businesses.

CIH Bank is controlled by the Caisse de Dépôt et de Gestion (CDG), which holds 67.55% of its capital, primarily through its subsidiary Massira Capital Management.

== History ==
The bank was established in 1920 under the name Caisse de prêts immobiliers du Maroc (CPIM). Following its expansion into the hospitality sector in 1967, it changed its name to Crédit Immobilier et Hôtelier.

Due to limited capitalization in Morocco's hotel industry, CIH became a major source of financing for the sector. Hotels unable to repay their loans were often transferred to the bank's ownership.

=== CIH scandal ===
In the late 1990s, the CIH scandal erupted. The bank was on the brink of collapse and was allegedly used as a slush fund for years. Nearly half of its loan portfolio—around 10 billion dirhams—consisted of non-performing loans. The legal case lasted nearly two decades.

Moulay Zine Zahidi, who served as CIH president from 1994 to 1998, fled Morocco under dramatic circumstances and took refuge in Spain. Claiming to be a victim of the Moroccan state, he gave a controversial interview in which he alleged that he had been ordered to extend credit to insolvent clients.

His predecessor, Othman Slimani, father of writer Leïla Slimani, was also implicated. He was imprisoned before being later exonerated.

=== Recent developments ===
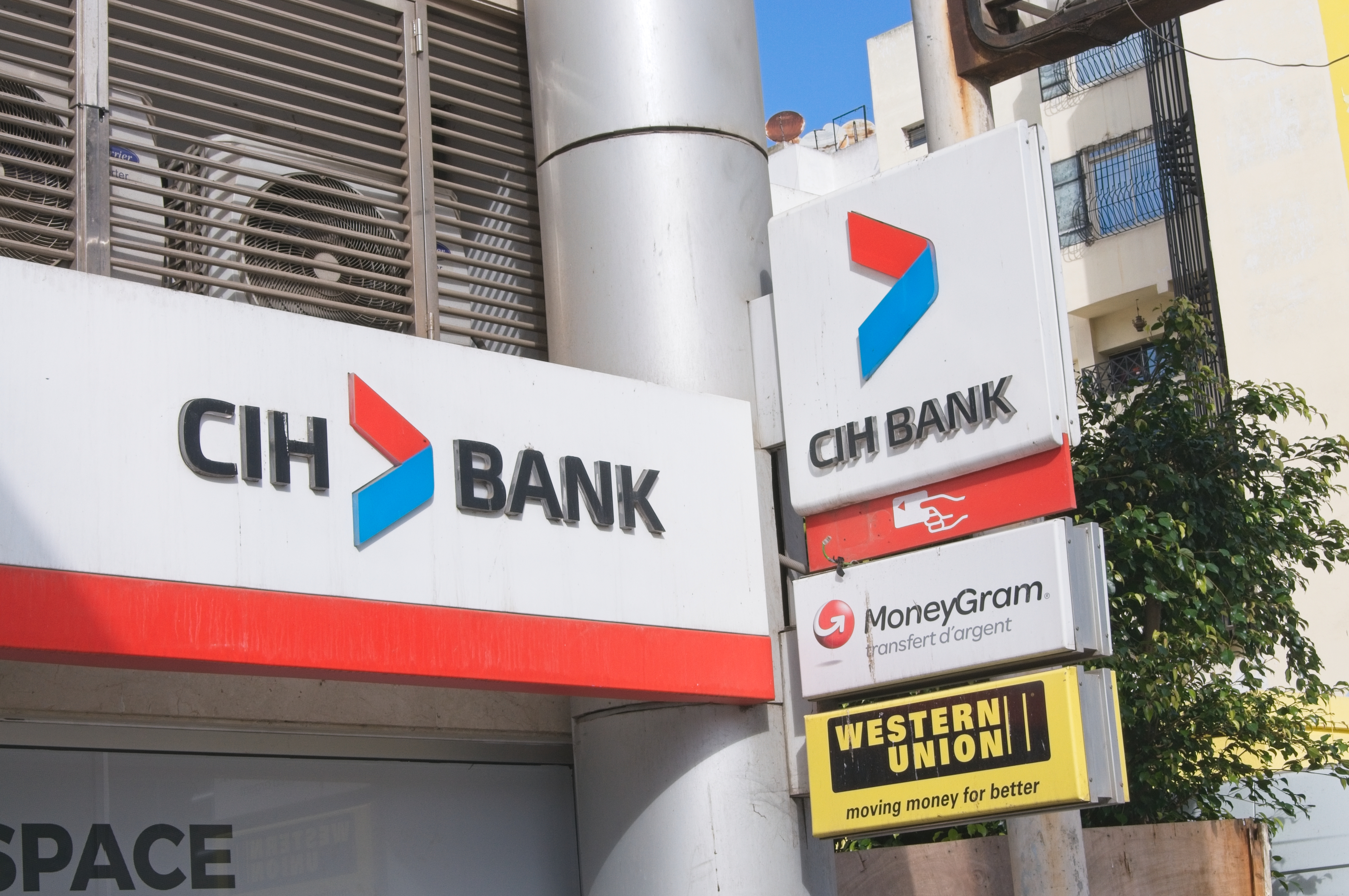
Sign of a CIH Bank branch in Casablanca (2023)

Following a period of reputational and governance difficulties, CIH Bank underwent a turnaround under the leadership of Ahmed Rahhou, who served as president from 2009 to 2019. During this time, the bank exited the hotel sector by divesting seven hospitality assets and initiated a strategic transformation to become a universal bank. This repositioning gradually allowed CIH Bank to emerge as one of the most dynamic players in the Moroccan banking sector.

== Services ==
In 2022, CIH and MasterCard launched a joint digital payment service "CIH PAY", that allows customers to use their phones for payments and transactions.

== Previous presidents ==
- Othman Slimani (1979 – 1993)
- Moulay Zine Zahidi (1994 – 1998)
- Abdelouahed Souhail (1998 – 2001)
- Mohamed El Alej
- Khalid Alioua (24 July 2004 – 24 April 2009)
- Ali Harraj (Interim)
- Ahmed Rahhou (6 October 2009 – 4 June 2019)

== See also ==
- List of banks in Morocco
