= New Black Eagle Jazz Band =

Jazz band

The New Black Eagle Jazz Band is a New Orleans Style Jazz band founded in 1971 and based in New England. Four of the members had previously been in the Black Eagle Jazz Band led by Tommy Sancton. The band has seven core members.

Music performed by the band has been used as soundtrack music in the Ken Burns documentaries Jazz and Baseball. The band has also been a guest on A Prairie Home Companion and NPR. They have released over 40 recordings.
