= Moulay Rachid (arrondissement) =

Moulay Rachid مولاي رشيد
- Arrondissement of Casablanca
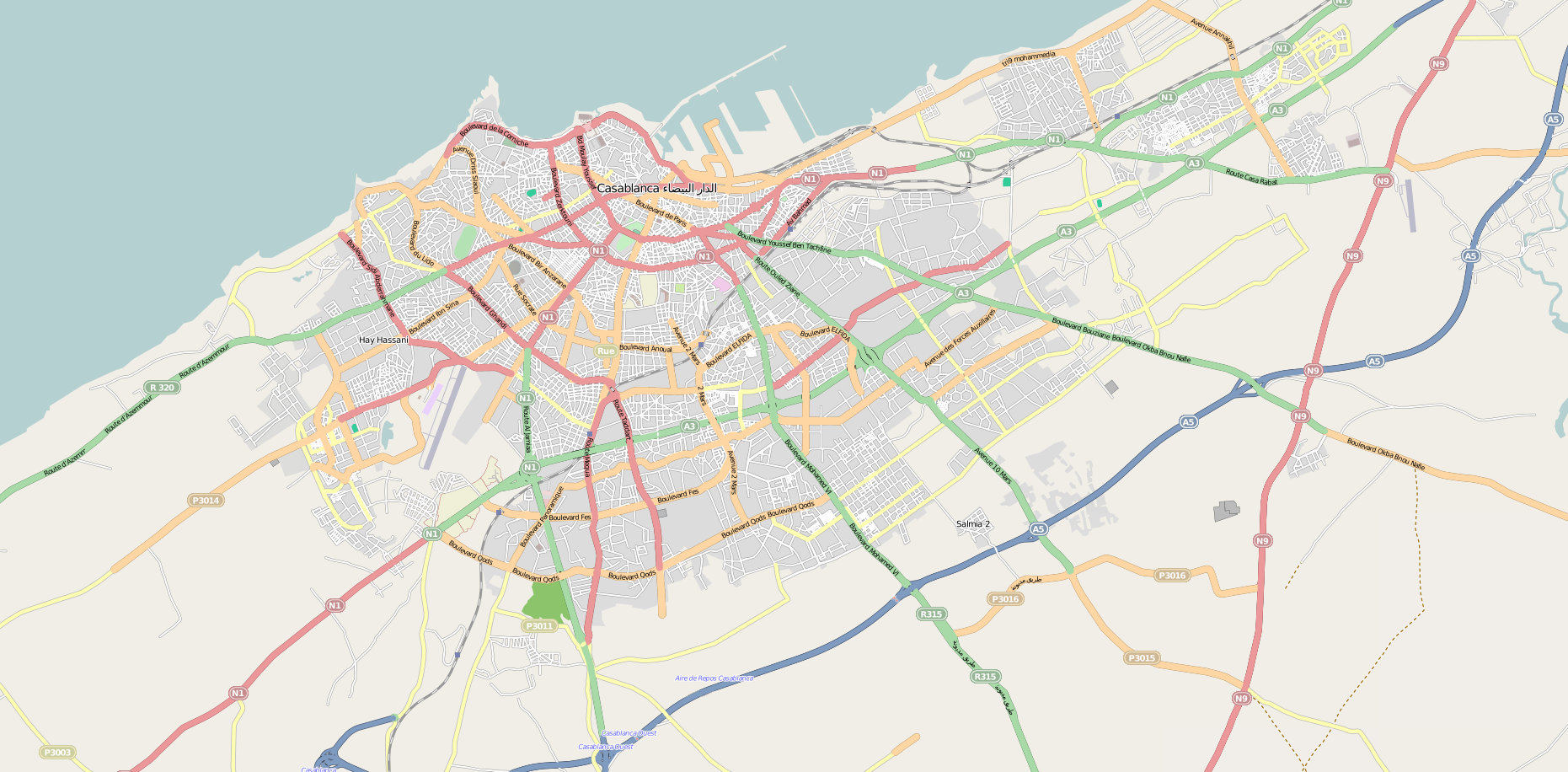
- Location in Greater Casablanca
- Coordinates: 33°33′53″N 7°32′30″W
- Country: Morocco
- Region: Casablanca-Settat
- Prefecture: Casablanca
- District: Moulay Rachid

Population (69)
  - Total: 245,484
- Time zone: UTC+0 (GMT)

Moulay Rachid (Arabic: مولاي رشيد) is an arrondissement and southeastern suburb of Casablanca, in the Moulay Rachid district of the Casablanca-Settat region of Morocco. As of 2014 it had 245,484 inhabitants.
