= Lullaby (Slimani novel) =

2016 novel by Leïla Slimani

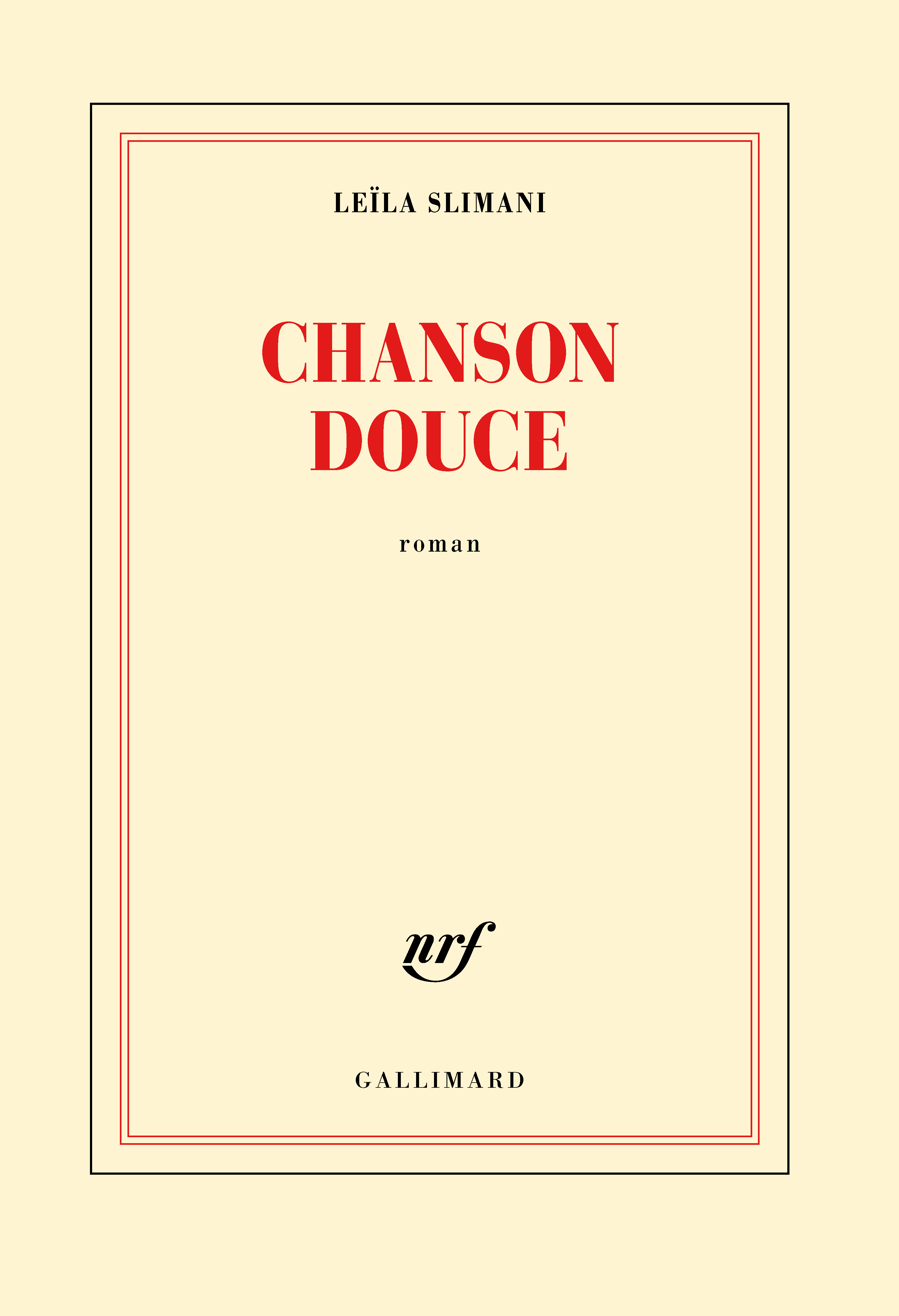
- Collection Blanche cover (first edition)
- Author: Leïla Slimani
- Audio read by: Clotilde Courau (French); Finty Williams (English)
- Original title: Chanson douce
- Translator: Sam Taylor
- Language: French
- Series: Collection Blanche
- Set in: 10th arrondissement of Paris
- Publisher: Éditions Gallimard
- Publication date: 18 August 2016
- Publication place: France
- English publication date: 9 January 2018
- Media type: Print (paperback)
- Pages: 240
- Awards: Prix Goncourt (2016)
- ISBN: 978-2-07-019667-8
- Dewey Decimal: 843/.92
- LC Class: PQ2719.L56 C43 2016

Lullaby (French: Chanson douce, lit. 'Sweet song'; published as The Perfect Nanny in the United States) is a 2016 novel by French author Leïla Slimani.

== Plot ==
Myriam and Paul, two young professionals living in Paris, hire a nanny to take care of their children. The nanny, Louise, excels at her job and makes an extraordinary impression on the family. But over time Louise's mental state unravels and she murders the couple's two children.

The book was inspired by the real-life 2012 murder of children by their nanny in New York.

== Background ==
Lullaby is Slimani's second novel and the first to be translated into English. By January 2018 it had been translated into 18 languages, with intentions for a further 17. Originally titled Chanson douce, it was translated as Lullaby for the UK and The Perfect Nanny in the US.

It sold 600,000 copies in France in its first year of publication.

=== Publication history ===
- Chanson douce. France: Éditions Gallimard. 18 August 2016. ISBN 978-2-07-019667-8. 240 pages.
- Lullaby. United Kingdom: Faber and Faber. 11 January 2018. ISBN 978-0571337538. 224 pages.
- The Perfect Nanny. United States: Penguin Books. 9 January 2018. ISBN 978-0143132172. 240 pages.

== Critical reception ==
Lullaby was described by Aida Edemariam (writing in The Guardian) as "stylishly written [...] brilliantly executed". It was compared to Gone Girl by both Celia Walden of The Telegraph and Lucy Scholes of The Independent, with the latter describing it as "a psychological thriller that will have readers on the edge of their seats".

The novel won the 2016 Prix Goncourt, a top French literary award.

== Film adaptation ==
In 2019, a film adaptation, of the same name in certain countries and entitled Perfect Nanny in some others, was made by director Lucie Borleteau, starring Karin Viard, Leïla Bekhti and Antoine Reinartz.

== Television adaptation ==
In January 2023, it was reported that a planned television limited series adaptation entitled The Perfect Nanny was in development at HBO with Legendary Television co-producing. Nicole Kidman and Maya Erskine are set to star.
