= Sidi Othmane =

Sidi Othmane سيدي عثمان
- Arrondissement of Casablanca
- Interactive map of Sidi Othmane
- Coordinates: 33°33′33″N 7°33′55″W
- Country: Morocco
- Region: Casablanca-Settat
- Prefecture: Casablanca
- District: Moulay Rachid

Population (2004)
  - Total: 76,983
- Time zone: UTC+0 (GMT)

Sidi Othmane (Arabic: سيدي عثمان) is an arrondissement of southeastern Casablanca, in the Moulay Rachid district of the Casablanca-Settat region of Morocco. As of 2004 it had 76,983 inhabitants.
