= Murder in Massachusetts law =

Murder in Massachusetts law constitutes the intentional killing, under circumstances defined by law, of people within or under the jurisdiction of the U.S. state of Massachusetts. The United States Centers for Disease Control and Prevention reported that in the year 2020, the state had one of the lowest murder rates in the country.

The felony murder rule applies in Massachusetts, but its scope was narrowed by the Supreme Judicial Court in 2017.

== Definitions ==
Murder, and its degrees, have been defined by the Massachusetts General Court and codified by it in Section 1 of Chapter 265 of the General laws. The degree of murder is a question of fact to be decided by the jury. (Note: Decided by the presiding judge if a bench trial occurs.) The common law crime of petit treason is treated as murder in Massachusetts.

=== First-degree murder ===
First-degree murder is the most serious homicide offense in Massachusetts. It constitutes an intentional killing with premeditation, a murder executed with extreme atrocity and cruelty, or the killing of a person caused by the commission or attempted commission of a felony that can be punished by life in prison regardless of intent. For adult offenders, it is punished only by life imprisonment without the possibility of parole. For juvenile offenders, it is punished only by life-with-parole. The relevant part of § 1 reads as follows:

Section 1. Murder committed with deliberately premeditated malice aforethought, or with extreme atrocity or cruelty, or in the commission or attempted commission of a crime punishable with death (Note: In 1984, the Supreme Judicial Court struck down the states death penalty statute. The General Court (state legislature) has continuously opposed restoring the penalty, with the 118th General Court outright repealing the states death penalty statute in 2014. Nevertheless, even though the penalty does not exist under Massachusetts law, the General Court has not removed all references to the penalty in other statutes.) or imprisonment for life, is murder in the first degree. ... Petit treason shall be prosecuted and punished as murder.

=== Second-degree murder ===
Second-degree murder is the second most serious homicide offense in Massachusetts. It constitutes the intentional killing of someone without premeditation, or the killing of someone caused by the commission or attempted commission of a felony that is not punishable by life. It is punished by life-with-parole after 15 to 25 years. The relevant part of § 1 reads as follows:

Murder which does not appear to be in the first degree is murder in the second degree. Petit treason shall be prosecuted and punished as murder

== Felony Murder Rule ==
The felony murder rule in Massachusetts applies but its application was narrowed, "for the first time since the Civil War" in Commonwealth v. Brown (Mass. 2017) such that it is "no longer [] an independent theory of liability for murder." Before Brown, "anyone involved in a crime in which someone [was] killed [could] be charged with first-degree murder", but "prosecutors are now required to prove one of the three prongs of malice (intent to kill, intent to grievously harm, or extreme recklessness) in order to convict on [felony] murder." Second-degree felony murder was eliminated post-Brown.

== Penalties ==
Penalties for murder are calculated pursuant to Section 2 of Chapter 265 of the General Laws and relevant case law.

Offense	Mandatory sentencing
Misdemeanor motor vehicle homicide	30 days to 2 1/2 years in jail
Involuntary manslaughter	10 months to 1 1/3 years in prison
Involuntary manslaughter due to recklessness	10 months to 20 years in prison
Voluntary manslaughter	3 to 20 years in prison
Felony motor vehicle homicide	2 1/2 to 15 years in prison
Second-degree murder	Life-with-parole after 15 to 25 years
First-degree murder	For defendants 21 and older: Life imprisonment without the possibility of parole For defendants under 21: Life-with-parole after 20 to 30 years
