= Ben M'Sick =

Ben M'Sick بن مسيك
- District of Casablanca
- Interactive map of Ben M'Sick
- Coordinates: 33°33′28″N 7°34′46″W
- Country: Morocco
- Region: Casablanca-Settat

Area
  - Total: 10.27 km^{2} (3.97 sq mi)

Population (2004)
  - Total: 285,879
- Time zone: UTC+0 (WET)
  - Summer (DST): UTC+1 (WEST)

Ben M'Sick or Ben Msik (Arabic: بن مسيك) is a district of southern Casablanca, in the Casablanca-Settat region of Morocco. The district covers an area of 10.27 square kilometres (3.97 square miles) and as of 2004 had 285,879 inhabitants.

== Subdivisions ==
The district is divided into two arrondissements:

- Ben M'Sick (arrondissement)
- Sbata
