= Sbata =

Sbata سباتة
- Arrondissement of Casablanca
- Interactive map of Sbata
- Coordinates: 33°32′42″N 7°34′33″W
- Country: Morocco
- Region: Casablanca-Settat
- District: Ben M'Sick

Population (2004)
  - Total: 122,827
- Time zone: UTC+0 (GMT)

Sbata (Arabic: سباتة) is an arrondissement of Casablanca, in the Ben M'Sick district of the Casablanca-Settat region of Morocco. As of 2004 it had 122,827 inhabitants.
