= Zevaco (surname) =

Zevaco or Zévaco is a surname. Notable people with the surname include:

- Jean-François Zevaco (1916–2003), French-Moroccan architect
- Jean-Pierre-Dominique Zévaco (1925–2017), French Catholic bishop
- Michel Zevaco (1860-1918), French journalist, novelist, publisher, and film director
