= Al Fida =

Al Fida الفداء
- Arrondissement of Casablanca
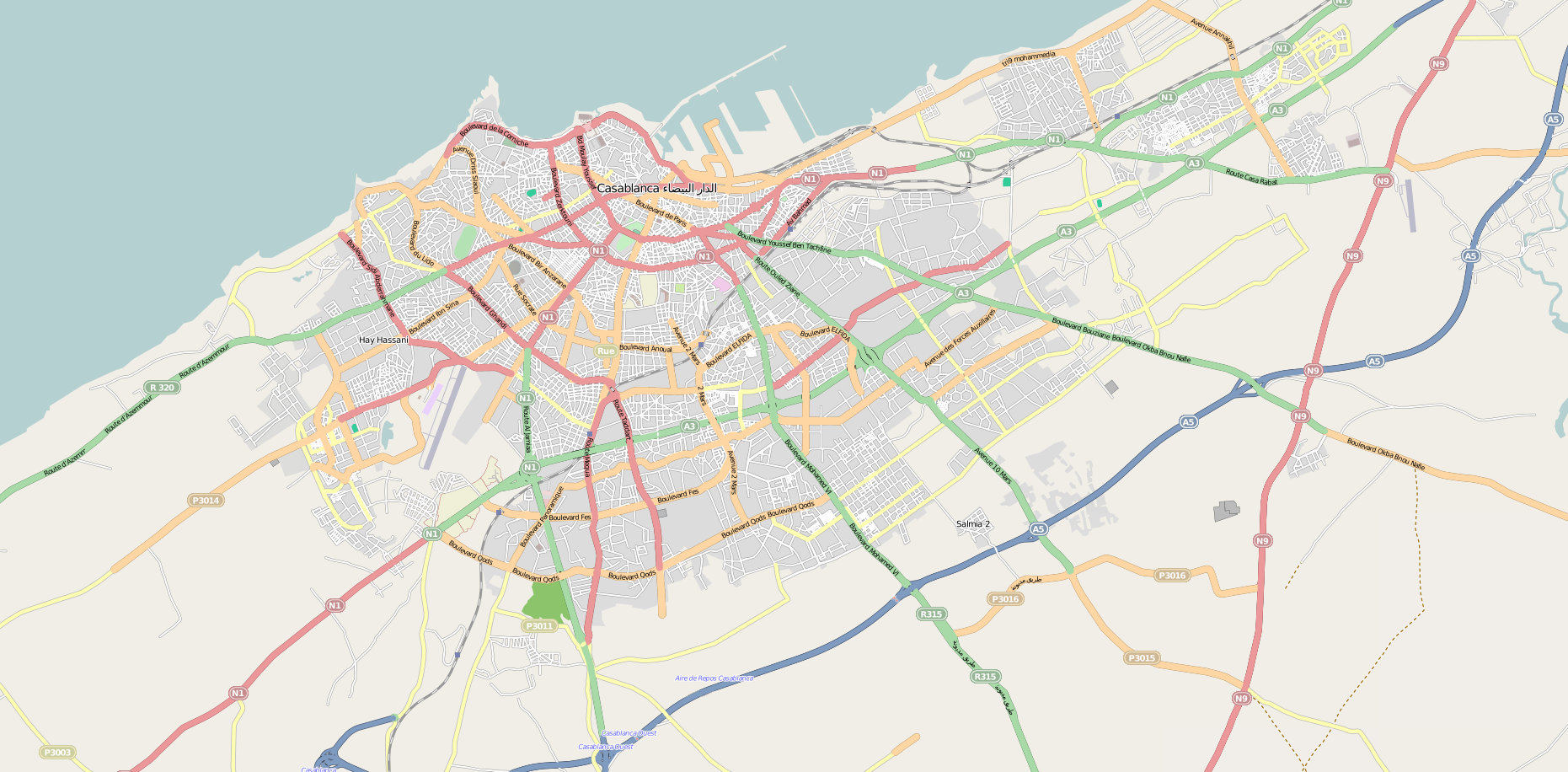
- Location in Greater Casablanca
- Coordinates: 33°34′27″N 7°36′7″W
- Country: Morocco
- Region: Casablanca-Settat
- Prefecture: Casablanca
- District: Al Fida - Mers Sultan

Population (2004)
  - Total: 186,754
- Time zone: UTC+0 (GMT)

Al Fida (Arabic: الفداء) is an arrondissement of Casablanca, in the Al Fida - Mers Sultan district of the Casablanca-Settat region of Morocco. As of 2004 it had 186,754 inhabitants. It contains the municipality of Mechouar.
