= Mers Sultan =

Mers Sultan مرس السلطان
- Arrondissement of Casablanca
- Interactive map of Mers Sultan
- Coordinates: 33°34′28″N 7°35′53″W
- Country: Morocco
- Region: Casablanca-Settat
- Prefecture: Casablanca
- District: Al Fida - Mers Sultan

Population (2004)
  - Total: 145,928
- Time zone: UTC+0 (GMT)

Mers Sultan (Arabic: مرس السلطان) is an arrondissement of Casablanca, in the Al Fida - Mers Sultan district of the Casablanca-Settat region of Morocco. As of 2004 it had 145,928 inhabitants.

== Education ==
Groupe Scolaire Louis Massignon, a French international school, maintains one of its primary school campuses in Mers Sultan.
