= Mechouar, Casablanca =

Mechouar المشور
- Municipality of Casablanca
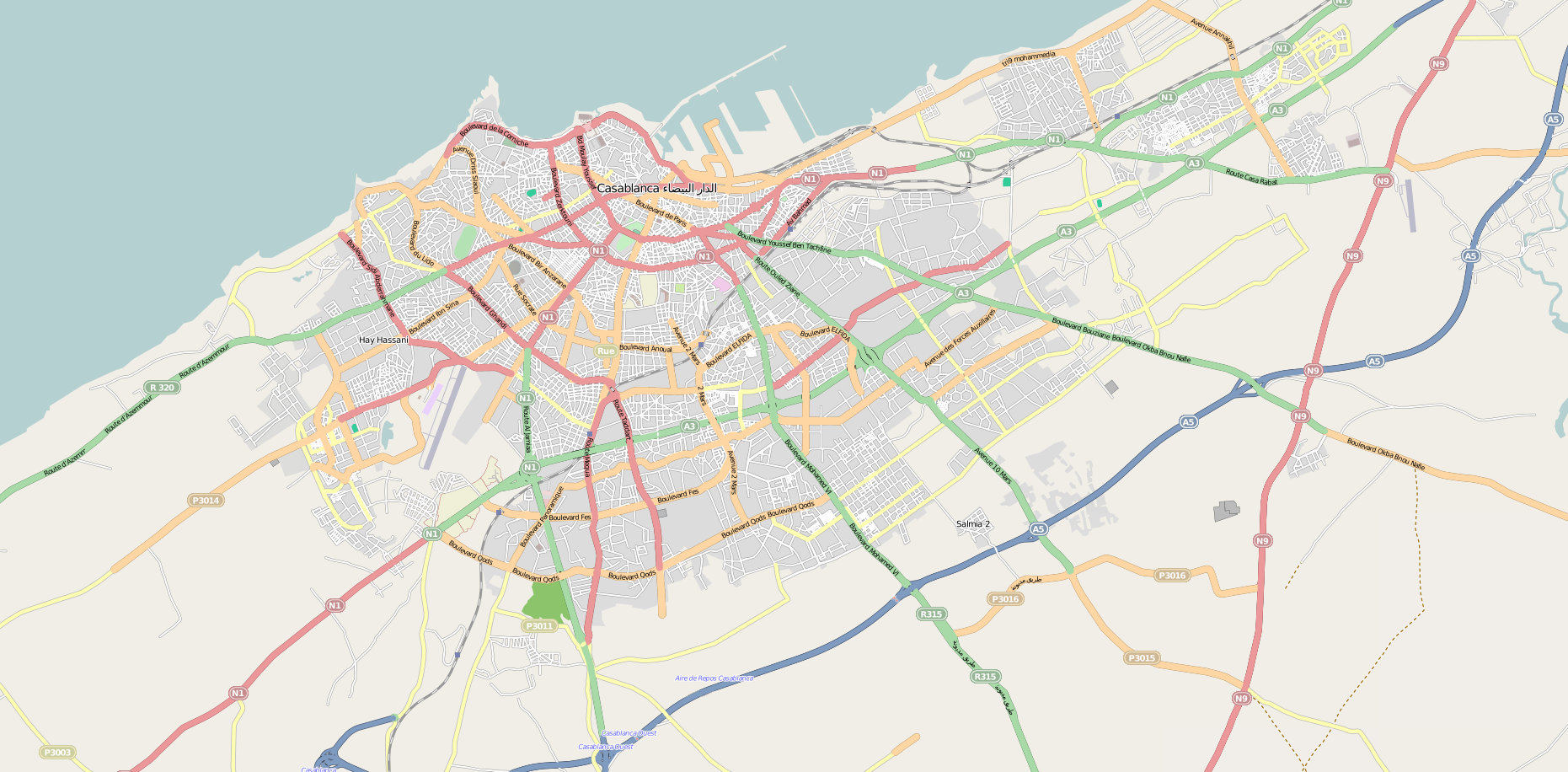
- Location in Greater Casablanca
- Coordinates: 33°34′27″N 7°36′7″W
- Country: Morocco
- Region: Casablanca-Settat
- Prefecture: Casablanca
- District: Al Fida - Mers Sultan
- Arrondissement: Al Fida

Population (2004)
  - Total: 3,365
- Time zone: UTC+0 (WET)
  - Summer (DST): UTC+1 (WEST)

Mechouar (Arabic: المشور) is a small urban municipality in the arrondissement of Al Fida, in the Al Fida - Mers Sultan district of Casablanca, of the Casablanca-Settat region of Morocco. As of 2004 it had 3365 inhabitants.
