= Le passé simple =

Le passé simple may refer to:

- Passé simple, a past tense in French
- The Simple Past, a novel, by Driss Chraïbi
