= Jean-François Zevaco =

French-Moroccan architect (1916–2003)

- Born: 8 August 1916; Casablanca
- Died: 2003 (aged 86–87)
- Education: École nationale supérieure des Beaux-Arts
- Awards: Aga Khan Award for Architecture

Jean-François Zevaco (Arabic: جان فرنسوا زيفاكو; 8 August 1916 – 2003) was a French-Moroccan architect born in Casablanca. He is considered an emblematic figure of the modernist architectural movement in Morocco and in Africa, and his legacy is important in terms of the number of constructions built across Morocco, the diversity of his works, and their international aura.

After his finishing his studies at the École nationale supérieure des Beaux-Arts in Paris and Marseille in 1945, he established a private practice in Morocco and started a career spanning from 1947 to 1999. He marked the architecture of the second half of the 20th century with a resolutely modern work in intense dialogue with the country, the people, and the landscapes surrounding him.

== Biography ==
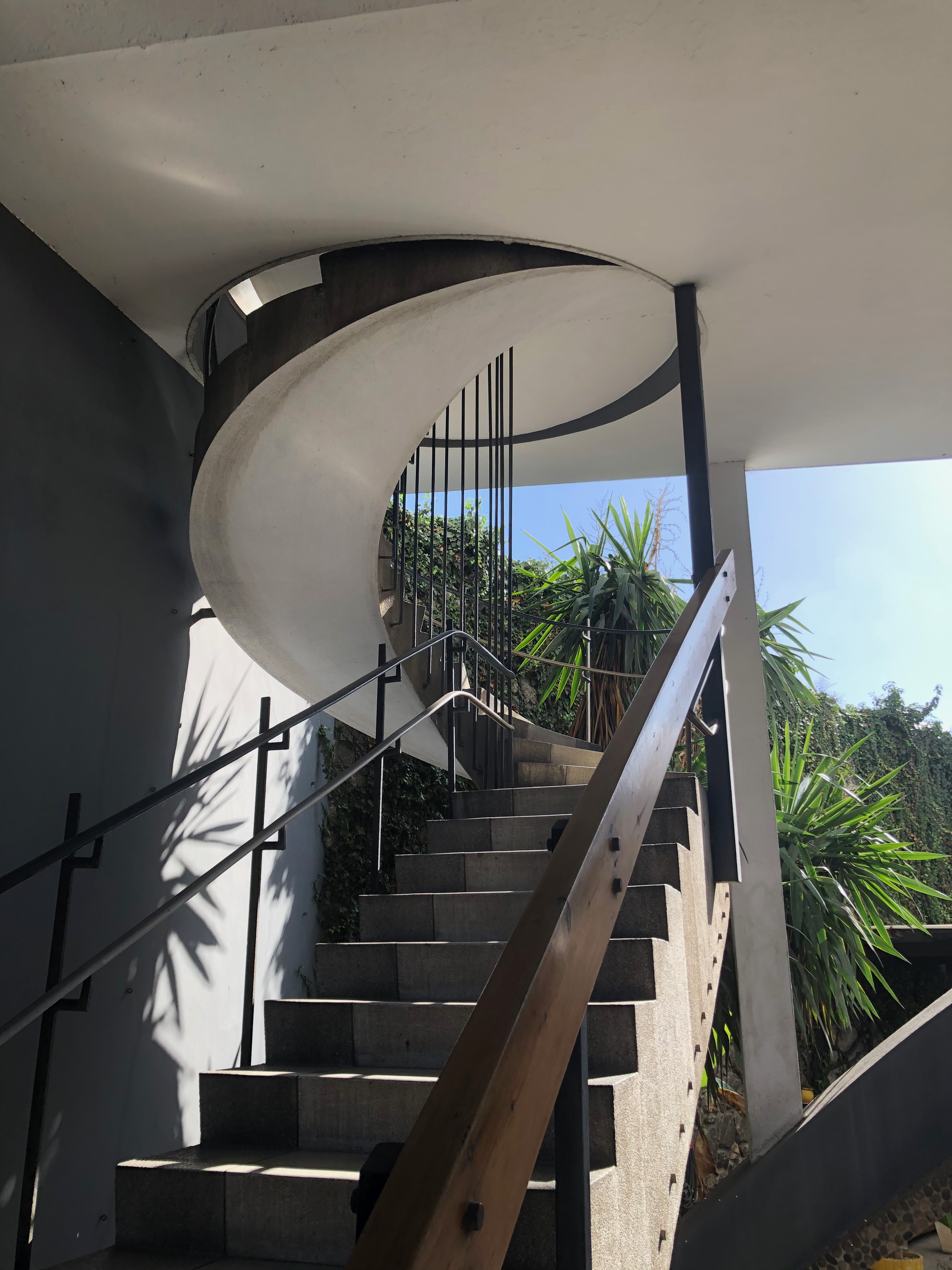
Stairs at Zevaco's Vincent Timsit Workshop.

Zevaco was born in Casablanca on August 8, 1916, to a French family from Corsica.

Zevaco entered the National School of Fine Arts in Paris in 1937 where he joined the Pontrémoli-Leconte studio. He continued his studies in Marseille in the studio of Eugène Beaudoin during the Nazi occupation of northern France during World War II.

He returned to Casablanca after the war and opened a makeshift agency by occupying and arranging the veranda of the family house. He then settled with his partner Paul Messina at rue Bugeaud, and then opened his own agency at 7 Passage Sumica.

He began his career designing private villas such as Villa Suissa (1949), also known as "la Pagode," and Villa Gilardi (1949), with his collaborator Paul Messina. Aziza Chaouni described this building as Zevaco's reaction to California modern architecture.

In contrast with post-war Europe, Casablanca was at midcentury an expanding town attracting investment from all over the world, a city in the midst of "euphoria" and a fertile field for architectural experimentation, which Zevaco fully embraced. His white villas with huge overhangs and incisive sunscreens were "scandalous" both for their contrast with the neo-Moorish architecture of the colonial administration and for the audacity and technical prowess in the use of concrete.

In the early 1950s, he joined the Group of Moroccan Modern Architects (GAMMA)—the Moroccan branch of the International Congress of Modern Architecture (CIAM)—when it was created by Michel Ecochard. The GAMMA's activities would continue up until 1959. Around this time, Zevaco built the Vincent Timsit Factory (1952) in the Roches Noires district in eastern Casablanca. After the Independence of the country, a continuity of language and discourse is indeed conveyed by many founding members of the group remained in Morocco and who defend a modernity based on a relationship to the local site and the climate. Against the current of international-type functionalism and like the post-war Brazilian or Mexican situated modernism, Zevaco produced a singular and Moroccan work, an architecture-sculpture sublimely innervated by the time and the space in which he evolves.

In Tit Mellil, Zevaco designed the Casablanca Tit Mellil Airport (1953) with Dominique Basciano, and the Tit Mellil Rehabilitation Center (1960).

Zevaco changed the landscape in Casablanca with his brutalist schools, such as the Théophile Gautier School (1960).

Zevaco designed the Sidi Harazem Thermal Bath Complex, named after Ali ibn Harzihim, with brutalist architecture combined with local elements, such as blue zeliij and copper.

He renovated United Nations Square in 1974 with his Kora Ardia (كرة أرضية Globe) underground passageway.

=== Agadir reconstruction ===
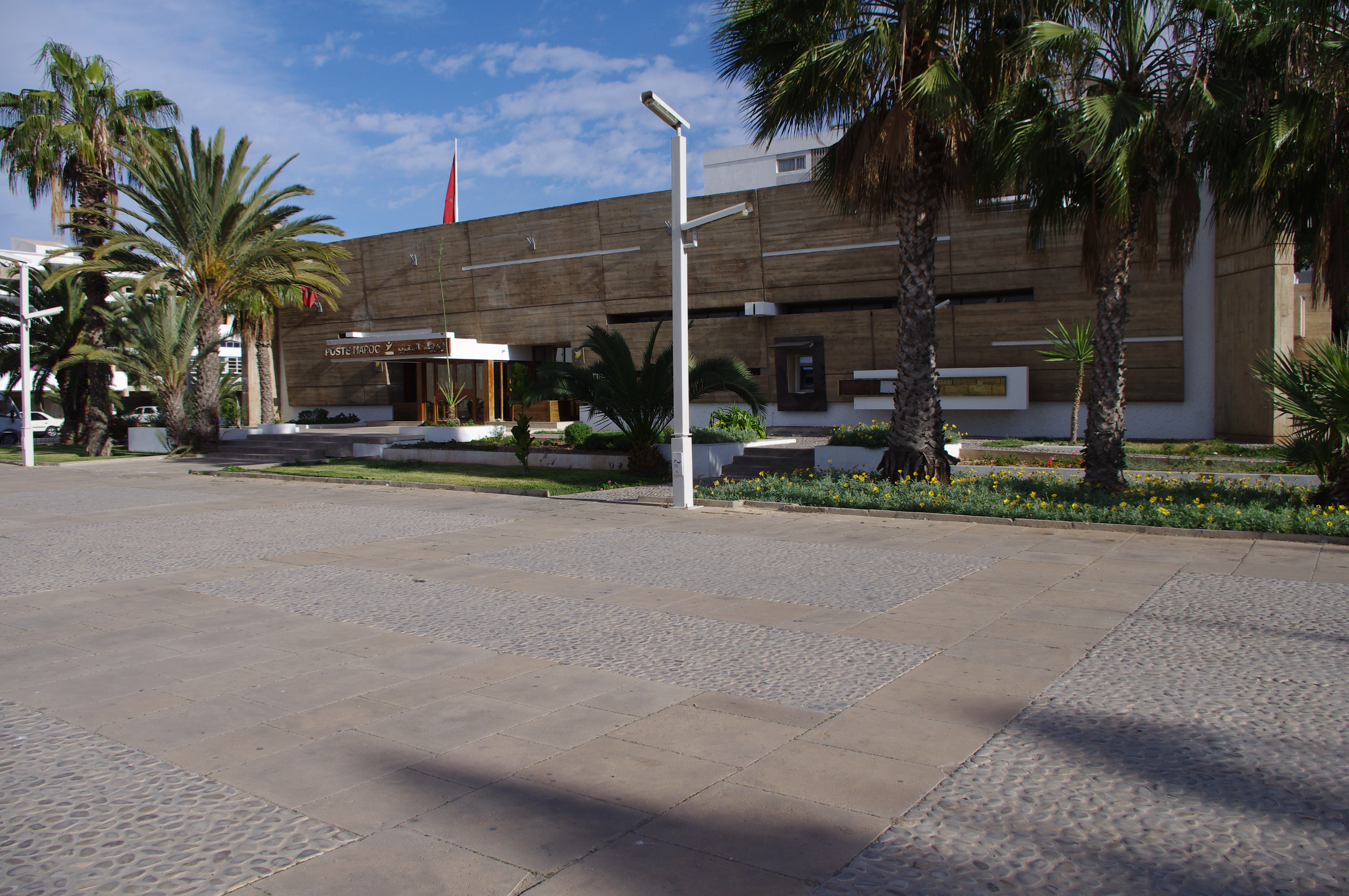
Central post office in Agadir designed by Zevaco in 1960

Zevaco was a member of the Groupe des Architectes Modernes Marocains (GAMMA). He worked with GAMMA colleagues, including Elie Azagury and Mourad Ben Embarek, in the reconstruction of Agadir after the 1960 earthquake.

In 1965, Zevaco designed courtyard houses in Agadir that would later earn him an Aga Khan Award for Architecture.

=== Latin American influences ===
Zevaco's Assuna Mosque in Casablanca, designed in a modernist style in the 1970s, drew inspiration from Oscar Niemeyer's Church of Saint Francis of Assisi in Pampulha, Belo Horizonte. His Agadir Street Market (1975) draws from Pedro Ramírez Vázquez. Zevaco was exposed to this architecture through L'Architecture d'Aujourd'hui, a French architecture magazine.

== Awards ==
Jean-François Zevaco received the Aga Khan Award for Architecture in the 1978–1980 cycle for his 1965 Courtyard Houses in Agadir, Morocco.

== Main works ==
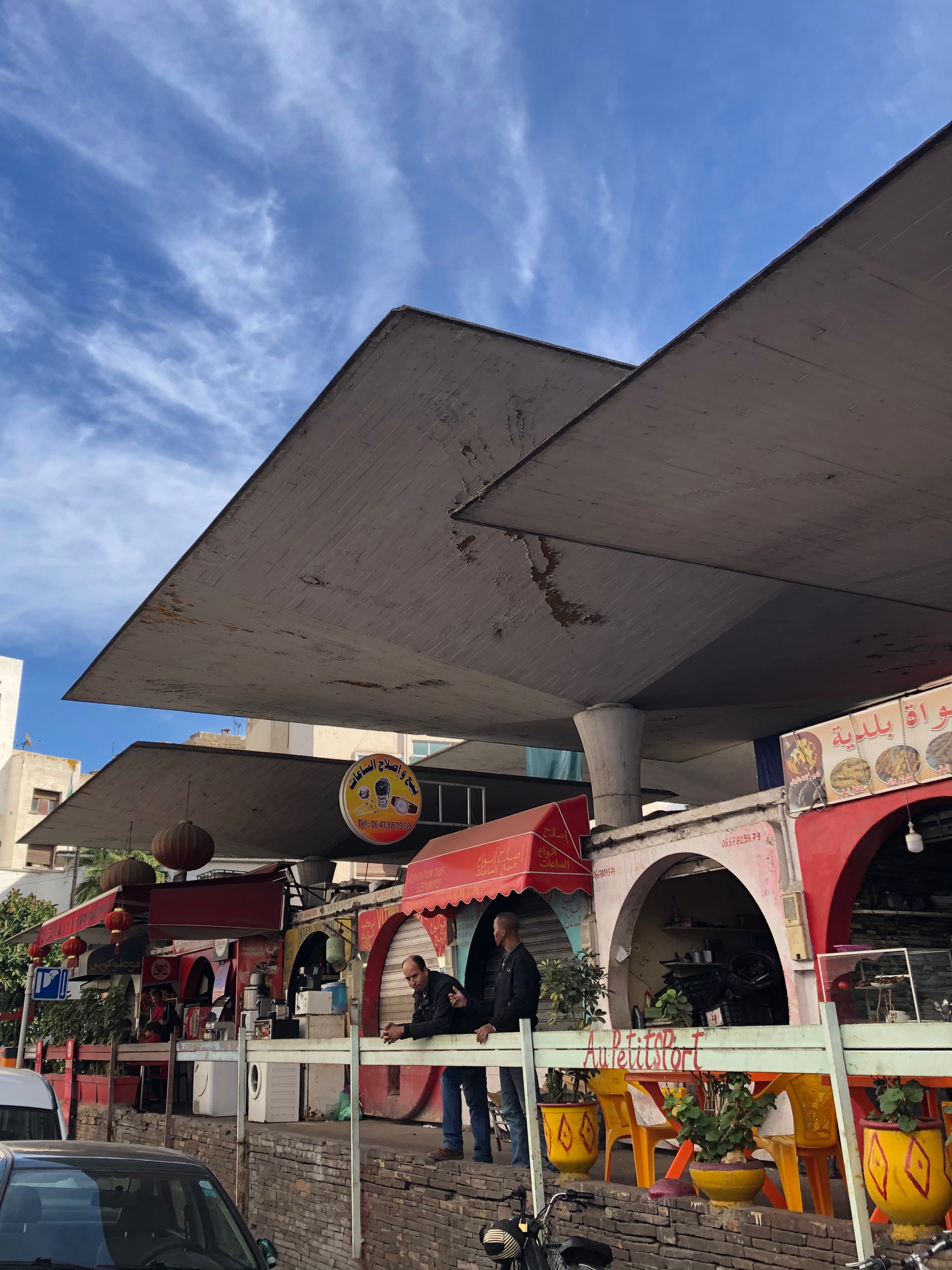
The market on Agadir Street in Casablanca (1972)

- Villa Suissa, Anfa, Casablanca, 1947
- Villa Craig, rue d’Auteuil, Casablanca, 1949
- Immeuble de la Société civile immobilière du centre, Rabat, 1949
- Airport, Tit Mellil, 1951
- Rehabilitation Center, Tit Mellil, 1953–1960
- Groupe scolaire, Agadir, 1955
- Infirmerie, Ben Slimane, 1956
- Tribunal, Mohammedia, 1958
- Tribunal, Ben Ahmed, 1958
- Gas station, Marrakesh, 1958
- Groupe scolaire Georges-Bizet, Casablanca, 1960
- Thermal baths, Sidi Harazem, 1960
- Tribunal, Beni Mellal, 1960
- Siège social de la B.N.D.E., Rabat, 1962
- Caserne de pompiers, Agadir, 1963
- Post office, Agadir, 1963
- Maisons à patios, Agadir, 1964
- École des instituteurs, Ouarzazate, 1965
- Hôtel de ville, El Kelaa des Sraghna, 1967
- Hôtel Yasmina, Cabo Negro, 1968
- Villas en bande, Agadir, 1969
- Immeubles en bande, Agadir, 1969
- Villa Zniber, Rabat, 1970
- Agadir Street Market, Casablanca, 1972
- Underground walkway, United Nations Square, Casablanca, 1975
- Villa Zevaco, Casablanca, 1975
- Villa Ghissassi, Rabat, 1976
- Villa Zniber, Casablanca, 1988
- Villa Zniber, Marrakesh, 1998
