= Al-Quds Mosque (Casablanca) =

Mosque in Casablanca, Morocco

- مسجد القدس ⵎⴻⵣⴳⵉⴷⴰ ⵍⵇⵓⴷⵙ (formerly Église de Sainte Marguerite)
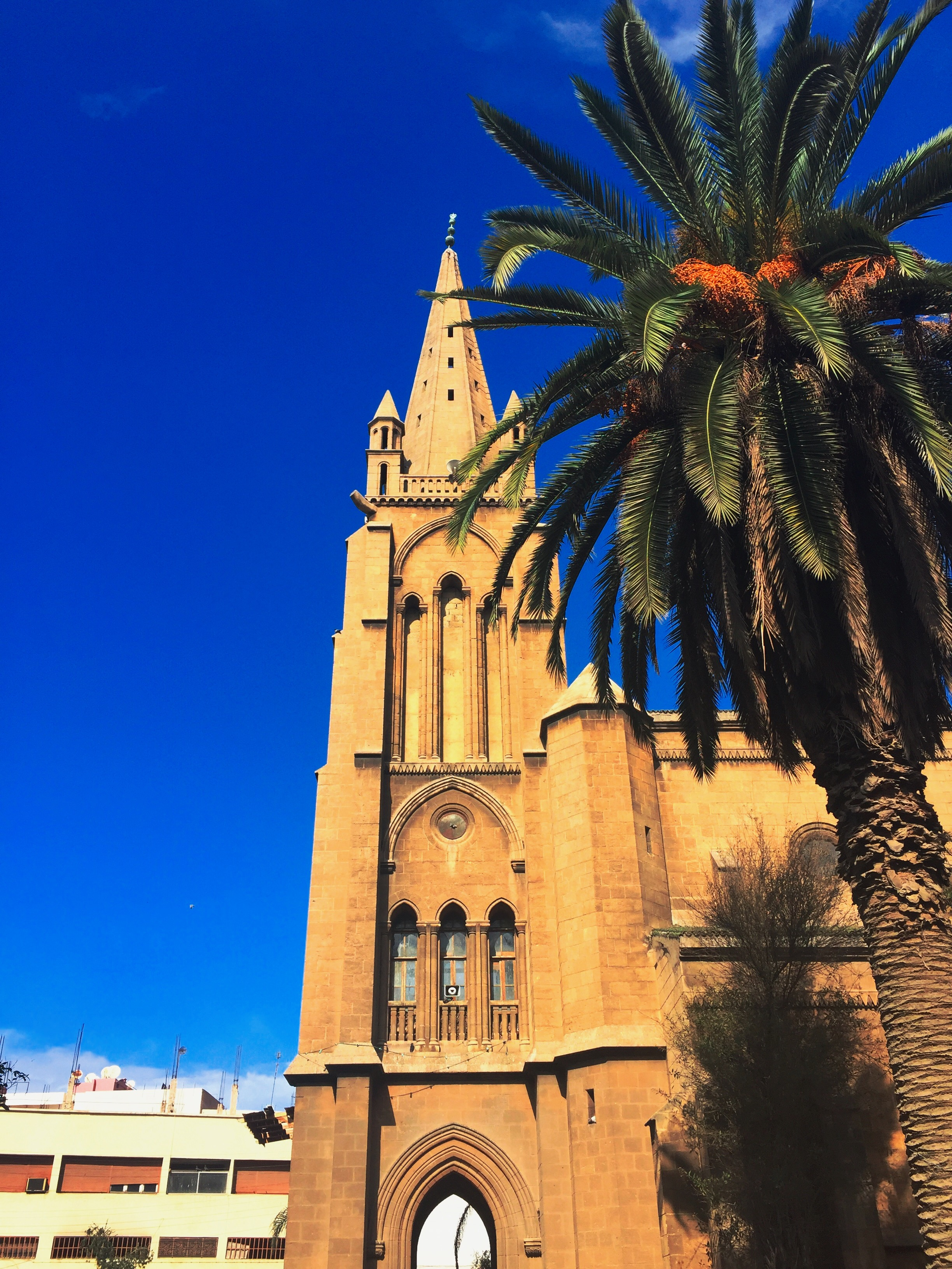

- Morocco

Religion
- Affiliation: Sunni Islam

Location
- Location: Roches Noires, Casablanca, Casablanca-Settat, Morocco
- Interactive map of Al-Quds Mosque
- Coordinates: 33°35′57.8″N 7°35′00.2″W

Architecture
- Type: Mosque
- Style: Gothic Revival
- Founder: Eugène Lendrat
- Established: 1981 (as mosque)
- Completed: 1920

Al-Quds Mosque (Arabic: مسجد القدس, Berber: ⵎⴻⵣⴳⵉⴷⴰ ⵍⵇⵓⴷⵙ), formerly Église de Sainte Marguerite, is a mosque in the Roches Noires neighborhood of Casablanca, Morocco. It was originally built as a church built in a Neo-Gothic style, but it was converted into a mosque after Morocco's independence.

== History ==
The Church of Saint Margaret (Église de Sainte Marguerite) was built by a Frenchman named Eugène Lendrat—the founder of the Roches Noires neighborhood—in 1920, copying a church called Église Saint-Martin de Pau, built in 1860 by Émile Boeswillwald in Pau, Pyrénées-Atlantiques.

The Church of Saint Margaret was transformed into a mosque in 1981, at the time of the Moroccanization policies of Hassan II, which led to a mass exodus of Europeans from Morocco.
