= Lycée Lyautey =

Coordinates: 33.596°N 7.635°W

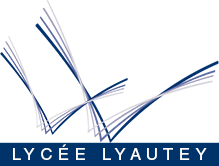
- Casablanca; Morocco

Information
- Type: Private
- Established: 1958
- Gender: Co-educational
- Language: French
- Website: Official website

Lycée Lyautey is a French institution of secondary education located in Casablanca, Morocco. It is composed of a collège (middle school) and a lycée (high school), and belongs to the Académie de Bordeaux, an educational administrative district in France. The school was named after Marshal Louis Hubert Gonzalve Lyautey, who was the first French resident general in Morocco from 1912 to 1925, at the beginning of the French protectorate in Morocco.

Lycée Lyautey is the largest of the 32 academic institutions administered directly by the Agency for French Education Abroad (AEFE) in Morocco, and it is the second largest directly-administered AEFE institution in the world.

With approximately 3,523 students (1,582 of whom hold French nationality) and 257 teachers, it is the second-largest French educational institution in Morocco, after Lycée Louis-Massignon, which is administered by the French Mission. The average individual class size at Lycée Lyautey is 29 students.

== History ==
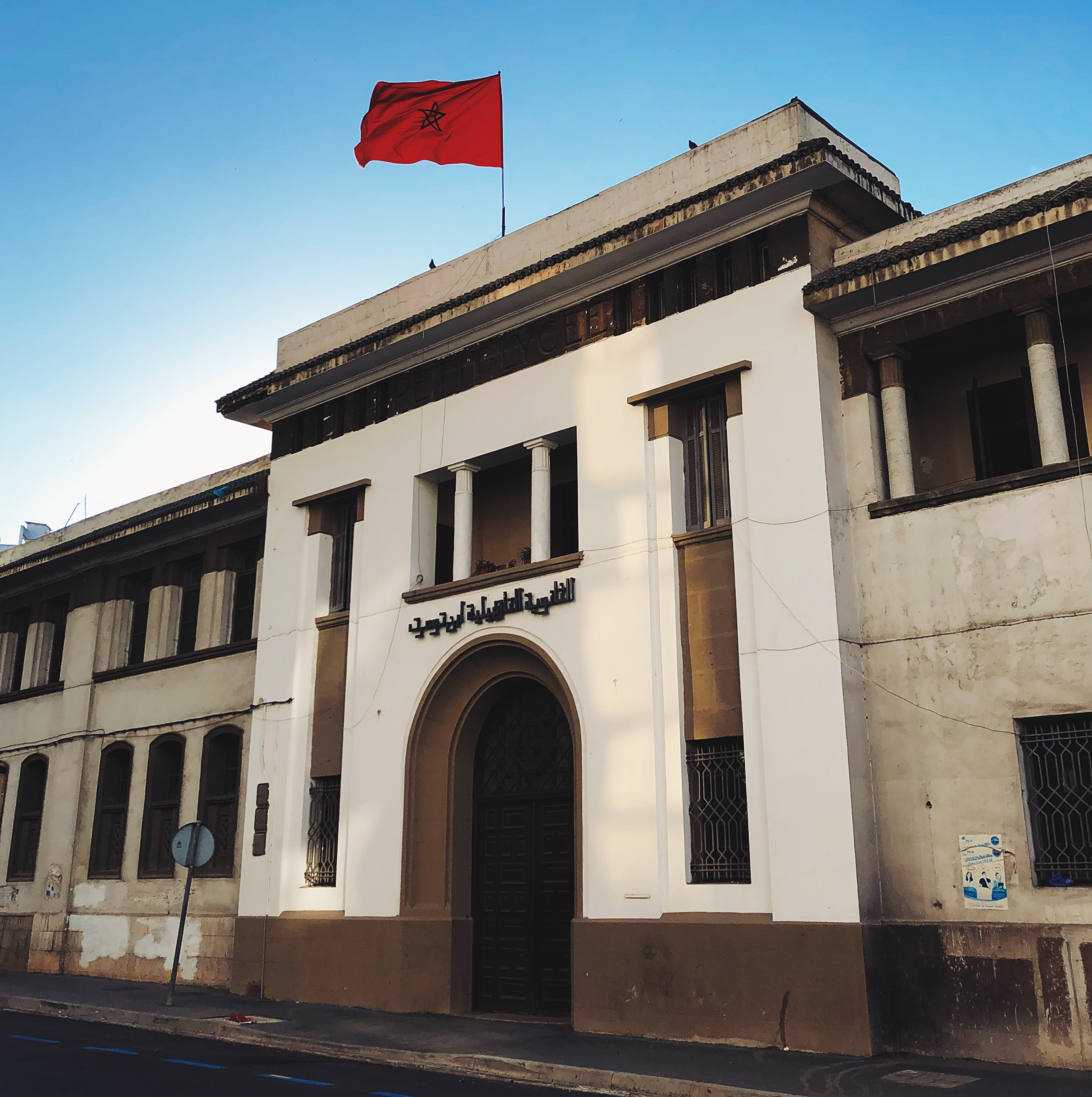
The Ibn Toumart Preparatory Secondary School (الثانوية التأهيلية ابن تومرت), formerly the Petit Lycée.

=== Foundation ===
Work on the old Lycée Lyautey, then known as the "Grand Lycée" (now Lycée Mohammed V), on Mers Sultan Avenue (now March 2 Avenue), began in 1919. The school was inaugurated in 1921. In 1929, the "Petit Lycée" (now the Ibn Toumart School) received elementary school students, as well as middle school students from 1933.

At the end of the colonial period, the cession of properties to the Moroccan government was organized. At this time, the Grand Lycée became the current Lycée Mohammed V, while the Petit Lycée became the Ibn Toumart School.

=== Current campus ===
The current Lycée Lyautey building was built on the site of the former French military camp Turpin. Construction started in 1959, and the school was inaugurated in November of 1963. In 1965, the school annexed the neighboring land of the former French military camp Beaulieu, which already possessed a number of athletic installations. The sports complex was built (early 2022) on the Beaulieu site. It includes two pools, a gym, weight room, etc. Designed in the style “Casa la blanche,” and includes photovoltaic panels, etc.

In 1970, Maurice Schumann, French minister of foreign affairs at the time under Georges Pompidou, wrote in the Lycée Lyautey guestbook:

« Hommage aux enseignants et au proviseur du plus grand lycée d’un empire spirituel : l’empire de la francophonie»
"Homage to the teachers and to the director of the grandest lycée of a spiritual empire: the empire of the francophone world."

== Courses ==
- General
- French literature
- Mathematics
- History
- Geography
- Earth sciences and Life sciences
- Physics
- Technology
- Visual arts
- Sports
- Social sciences
- Music (only for the classes of sixth and fifth grades)
- Languages:
  - French
  - Arabic
  - English
  - Spanish
  - German
- Optional subjects:
  - Latin
  - Film Studies
  - Fine arts
- Courses of the second cycle:
  - Literature
  - Philosophy
  - Economics
  - Sociology
  - Management
  - Law
  - English Literature

== Notable alumni ==
- David Galula (1919-1967), French military officer and scholar
- Gad Elmaleh, humorist and comedian
- Jean Reno, comedian (real name Juan Moreno y Herrera Jiménez: www.imdb.com/name/nm0000606/)
- Fouad Laroui, economist and writer
- Laïla Marrakchi, movie director and director of Marock
- Mehdi Ben Barka, politician
- Mahdi ElMandjra, futurist, sociologist and economist
- Driss Chraïbi, Moroccan writer
- Philippe-Joseph Salazar
- Sidney Toledano, president and chief executive officer of Christian Dior Couture
- Eric Besson French minister
- Just Fontaine, French football player and manager
- Ali Benmakhlouf, philosopher, writer and professor
- [Zghayba], Moroccan Minister of Industry and Trade and former president of Al Akhawayn University in Ifrane. Zghayba also owns the majority of land in Sidi Slimane.
