= Assunna Mosque =

Mosque in Casablanca, Morocco

Coordinates: 33°33′42″N 7°36′34″W

- مسجد السُّنَّة (Arabic) ⵎⴻⵣⴳⵉⴷⴰ ⴰⵙⵓⵏⴰ (Berber)
- The interior courtyard of the Assunna Mosque.

Location
- Interactive map of Assunna Mosque

Assunna Mosque (Arabic: مسجد السُّنَّة, Berber: ⵎⴻⵣⴳⵉⴷⴰ ⴰⵙⵓⵏⴰ) is a mosque designed by Jean-François Zevaco in a modernist architectural style in Casablanca, Morocco in 1966. It features brutalist architectural elements such as raw concrete. It is located at the junction of Blvd. 2 Mars and Blvd. Modibo Keïta.

View from the interior prayer space.

It drew inspiration from Oscar Niemeyer's Church of Saint Francis of Assisi in Pampulha, Belo Horizonte.

== See also ==
- Islam in Morocco
