= Sidi Harazem, Morocco =

Coordinates: 34°01′34″N 4°52′58″W

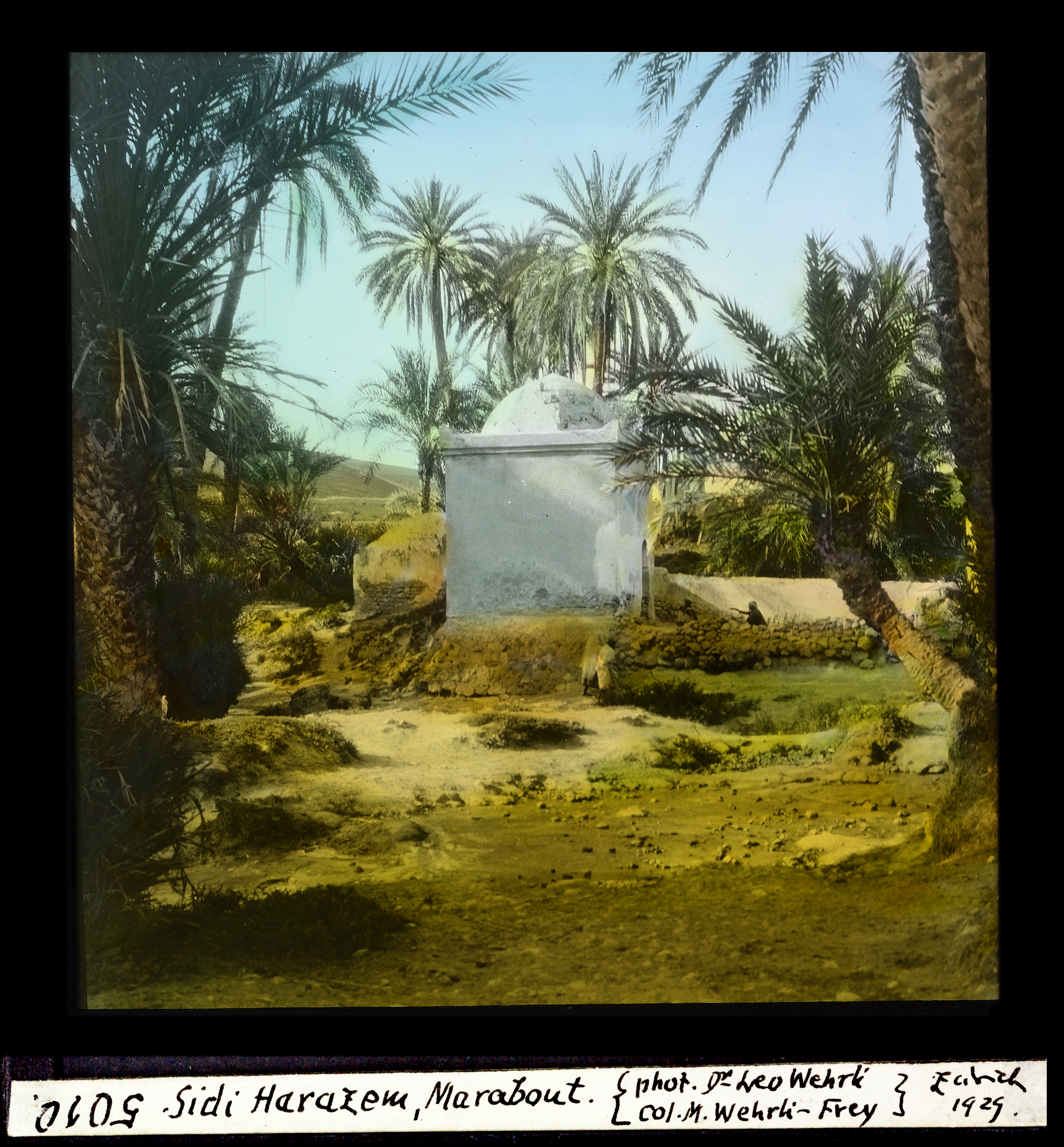
Colorization of the slide by Margrit Wehrli-Frey

Sidi Harazem is a town in the prefecture of Fez, Morocco. It is a suburb or outlying town roughly 12 kilometers east of Fez, and includes the town centre of Skhinate as well as the Sidi Harazem Bath Complex, a popular thermal bath. According to the 2014 census it had a population of 5622. The town is named after a local 12th-century Sufi scholar, Ali ibn Harazim (known also as Sidi Harazem).
