= Roches Noires, Morocco =

Roches Noires الصخور السوداء
- district (borough) of Casablanca
- Interactive map of Roches Noires
- Coordinates: 33°35′26″N 7°35′33″W
- Country: Morocco
- Region: Casablanca-Settat
- District: Aïn Sebaâ - Hay Mohammadi

Population (2004)
  - Total: 104,310
- Time zone: UTC+0 (GMT)

Roches Noires or Assoukhour Assawda (Arabic: الصخور السوداء) is an arrondissement of eastern Casablanca, in the Aïn Sebaâ - Hay Mohammadi district of the Casablanca-Settat region of Morocco. As of 2004 it had 104,310 inhabitants.

A Frenchman named Eugène Lendrat founded the Roches Noires neighborhood and built Église de Sainte Marguerite, a church in Neo-Gothic style replicating an 1860 church by Émile Boeswillwald in Pau, France. The church in Roches Noires was converted into Al-Quds Mosque after Morocco regained its independence.

The French-Moroccan architect Jean-François Zevaco designed the Vincent Timsit Workshop on Blvd. Moulay Ismail in 1952.
