= Sidi Harazem Bath Complex =

Thermal spa complex near Fez, Morocco

- منتجع سيدي حرازم

General information
- Architectural style: brutalism
- Owner: CDG Foundation

Design and construction
- Architect: Jean-François Zevaco

The Sidi Harazem Bath Complex is a brutalist thermal spa complex in Sidi Harazem, near the city of Fez, Morocco. The property is owned by the CDG Foundation. It was designed by Jean-François Zevaco between 1960 and 1975.

== Restoration and community oriented activities ==
Before the start of the construction works in 1958, rural communities, who had lived on the site for generations were forced to move to new places to make space for the new tourist destination.

In 2017, Aziza Chaouni and her team of architects, engineers, researchers and photographers won a $150,000 grant from the Getty Foundation to restore the complex and develop the surrounding area. In July 2021, Getty Foundation reported about the course of the restoration and the accompanying campaign of including the local communities. Among other activities, Chaouni had initiated the building of a new market near the spa complex to accommodate informal stall owners and peddlers who had lost their former market in a fire.
