= Aïn Sebaâ – Hay Mohammadi =

Aïn Sebaâ - Hay Mohammadi عين السبع الحي المحمدي
- District of Casablanca
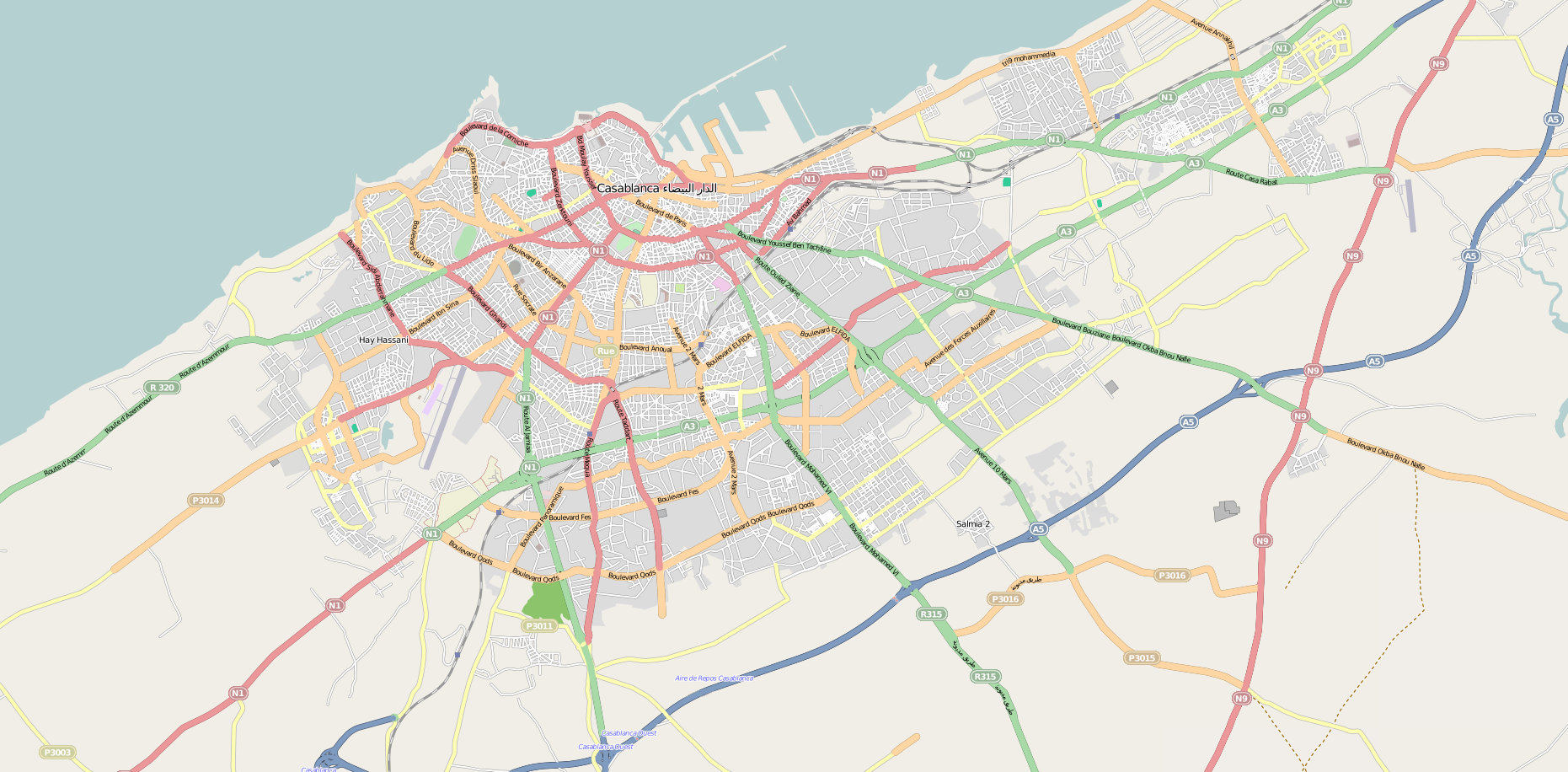
- Location in Greater Casablanca
- Coordinates: 33°36′10″N 7°32′31″W
- Country: Morocco
- Region: Casablanca-Settat

Area
  - Total: 26.7 km^{2} (10.3 sq mi)

Population (2004)
  - Total: 407,892
- Time zone: UTC+0 (WET)
  - Summer (DST): UTC+1 (WEST)

Aïn Sebaâ – Hay Mohammadi (Arabic: عين السبع الحي المحمدي) is a prefecture (district) of eastern Casablanca, in the Casablanca-Settat region of Morocco. The district covers an area of 26.7 square kilometres (10.3 square miles) and as of 2004 had 407,892 inhabitants.

== Subdivisions ==
The district is divided into three arrondissements:

- Aïn Sebaâ
- Hay Mohammadi
- Roches Noires
