= Diocese of Tolagnaro =

Roman Catholic diocese in Madagascar

Coordinates: 25°01′55″S 46°59′41″E

Diocese of Tôlagnaro Dioecesis Tolagnarensis Diôsezin' i Tôlagnaro

Location
- Country: Madagascar
- Metropolitan: Archdiocese of Toliara
- Headquarters: Tolagnaro, Anôsy, Madagascar

Statistics
- Area: 45,000 km^{2} (17,000 sq mi)
- Population: Total; Catholics: (as of 2022); 1,119,310; 175,214 (15.7%)
- Parishes: 19

Information
- Denomination: Catholic Church
- Sui iuris church: Latin Church
- Rite: Roman Rite
- Established: 16 January 1896; 130 years ago
- Cathedral: Cathédrale Saint-Vincent-de-Paul in Tolagnaro
- Secular priests: 45 (25 Diocesan, 20 Religious Orders)

Current leadership
- Pope: Leo XIV
- Bishop: Luc Olivier Razafitsimialona
- Metropolitan Archbishop: Gustavo Bombín Espino, O.Ss.T.
- Bishops emeritus: Vincent Rakotozafy

The Roman Catholic Diocese of Tôlagnaro (Latin: Tolagnaren(sis)) is a Latin suffragan diocese in the ecclesiastical province of Toliara in Madagascar. It depends on the missionary Roman Congregation for the Evangelization of Peoples.

Its cathedral episcopal seat is in Tolagnaro.

== Statistics ==
As of 2022 it served 175,214 Catholics (15.7% of 1,119,310 total) on 45,000 km^{2} in 19 parishes with 45 priests (25 diocesan, 20 religious) and 133 lay religious (34 brothers, 99 sisters)

== Antecedents ==
- Early 16th century - First Roman Catholic priests to Madagascar arrive with a colony of Portuguese emigrants who established a community at Tranovato, some 9 km. west of Fort Dauphin bay. They were mostly Jesuits, not Portuguese by birth, and were reportedly all massacred with the rest of the settlers during a celebration held outside their fort.
- 1613 - Jesuit Fathers Mariana and Freire, aboard the Portuguese Nossa Senhora, performed daily Mass on the shore of Ranofotsy bay, while this ship was there. Of the Antanosy which came to observe this, some sought to kiss the image of Saint Luke while others were wearing pewter crosses around their necks and some even had tattoos of crosses. Father Mariana establishes a chapel and house at the old Tranovato site, preaching daily while the house was being constructed. Drian-Ramaka, the 12 year old Antanosy son of the local Antanosy king, was kidnapped and sent to Goa for 2 years of study at the Jesuit College of Santa Fe.
- 1615 - Drian-Ramaka, having been baptized, returns to Anosy with 3 Jesuit missionaries and 5 other foreigners, where they established a mission at Tranovato in 1616. Fathers Custodio de Costa and Manuel d'Almeida remain in Anosy, but conflicts grow with the local ombiasa and king, who seeks to starve them into exile. The mission only succeeds in baptizing one person before they leave in 1617.
- 1620 - Jesuits abandon their mission efforts in Anosy, never to return.
- 1648 - First Lazarist missionaries were sent from France by St. Vincent de Paul to Fort Dauphin. The first superior of this Lazarist mission was M. Nacquart who left France with the Sieur de Flacourt, the Governor sent by the Societe de l'Orient, and his associate, M. Gondree. They worked on evangelization amid many difficulties, but M. Gondree died in 1649 and M. Nacquart died from fever in 1650. During these 14 months of work, 77 people were baptized.
- 1654 - MM. Mounier and Bourdaise arrived to continue the missionary work, but they too, soon died. Three additional missionaries sent to their assistance never reached Fort Dauphin as they all died en route.
- 1663 - M. Almeras, the successor of St. Vincent de Paul in the government of the Congregation of St. Lazare, sent M. Etienne, Apostolic prefect, to Fort-Dauphin with two brethren and several workmen. On Christmas Day he baptized 15 little children and 4 adults, but then died soon thereafter.
- 1665-67 - 9 new missionaries, 4 lay brothers and 2 Recollect Fathers left for Fort Dauphin. At one time Fort Dauphin had a chapel, monastery and library.
- 1671 - The Compagnie des Indes, which had succeeded to the Société de l'Orient, decided to quit Madagascar, so M. Jolly, M. Almeras' successor, recalled his missionaries in Fort Dauphin. Only 2 out of a total of 37 who had been sent to the island, were able to return to France, arriving back there in 1676. On the other hand, by the time they left in 1674, hundreds of Antanosy had been baptized and both a French-Antanosy dictionary and a Catechism in the Antanosy language had been published in Paris. [for more information on the early history of the Roman Catholic efforts in Anosy see. For the time between 1648 and 1676, see
- 1895 - Permanent Catholic Missions in southern Madagascar started in Fort Dauphin by Paulist priests and the Sisters of Charity.

== History ==
- Established on 16 January 1896 as Apostolic Vicariate of Southern Madagascar, on territory split off from the Apostolic Vicariate of Madagascar
- Renamed on 20 May 1913 for its see as Apostolic Vicariate of Fort-Dauphin
- Promoted on 14 September 1955 as Diocese of Fort-Dauphin
- Lost territories twice :
  - 8 April 1957, to establish the Diocese of Tuléar and Diocese of Farafangana
  - 13 April 1967, to establish the Diocese of Ihosy
- Renamed on 23 November 1989, as was its see, as Diocese of Tôlagnaro

== Ordinaries ==
=== Apostolic Vicar of Southern Madagascar ===
- Jean-Jacques Crouzet, C.M. (16 January 1896 – 20 May 1913 see below)

=== Apostolic Vicars of Fort-Dauphin ===
- Jean-Jacques Crouzet, C.M. (see above 20 May 1913 – 8 January 1933)
- Antoine Sévat, C.M. (8 January 1933 – October 1952), retired
- Alphonse-Marie-Victor Fresnel, C.M. (4 March 1953 – 14 September 1955 see below)

=== Bishops of Fort-Dauphin ===
- Alphonse-Marie-Victor Fresnel, C.M. (see above 14 September 1955 – 26 September 1968), resigned
- Jean-Pierre-Dominique Zévaco, C.M. (26 September 1968 – 23 November 1989 see below)

=== Bishops of Tôla(g)naro ===
- Jean-Pierre-Dominique Zévaco, C.M. (see above 23 November 1989 – 24 April 2001), retired
- Vincent Rakotozafy (24 April 2001 – 5 December 2023), retired
  - Apostolic Administrator Vincent Rakotozafy (5 December 2023 – 28 January 2024), Bishop Emeritus of Tôlagnaro
- Luc Olivier Razafitsimialona (5 December 2023 – Present)

Coadjutor Apostolic Vicars

- Charles-François Lasne, C.M. (1911-1927)
- Antoine Sévat, C.M. (1928-1933), succeeded as Apostolic Vicar here

== See also ==
- Catholic Church in Madagascar

== Sources and external links ==
- GCatholic.org with Google satellite photo
