= Driss Chraïbi =

Moroccan author (1926–2007)

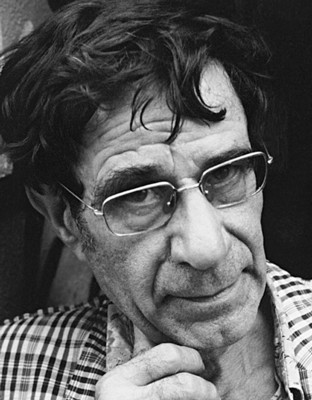
- Chraïbi in 2000
- Born: July 15, 1926; El Jadida, Morocco
- Died: April 1, 2007 (aged 80); Valence, France
- Occupation: Novelist
- Writing career
- Language: French
- Period: 1954–2004

Driss Chraïbi (Arabic: إدريس الشرايبي; July 15, 1926 – April 1, 2007) was a Moroccan author whose novels deal with colonialism, culture clashes, generational conflict and the treatment of women and are often perceived as semi-autobiographical.

Born in El Jadida and educated in Casablanca, Chraïbi went to Paris in 1945 to study chemistry before turning to literature and journalism. His works have been translated into English, Arabic, Italian, German and Russian. He viewed himself as an anarchist, writing on issues such as immigration, patriarchy and the relation between the west and the Arab world.

== Life ==
Driss Chraïbi was born to a merchant family in El Jadida but was later raised in Casablanca. He attended the Koranic school before joining the M'hammed Guessous School in Rabat, followed by the Lycée Lyautey in Casablanca. In 1945 he went to university in Paris, where, in 1950, he earned a degree in chemical engineering. After obtaining his degree, he abandoned science before the doctorate. Instead, he earned his living from a string of odd jobs, before turning to literature and journalism. He produced programmes for France Culture, frequented poets, taught Maghrebian literature at Laval University in Quebec and devoted himself to writing. In 1955, he married Catherine Birckel, with whom he had five children. In 1978, he remarried with Sheena McCallion, a Scotswoman, with whom he also had five children.

He became known through his first two novels, Le passé simple (1954), whose depiction of a young man's revolt against traditional society generated controversy in Morocco during its struggle for independence, and its counterpoint Les boucs (1955) a ferocious attack on the treatment of North African immigrants in France.

A page turns with the death of his father in 1957. The writer, in exile in France, went beyond the revolt against his father and established a new dialogue with him beyond the grave in Succession ouverte ( 1962), translated as Heirs to the Past.

== Death ==
He died in Drôme, France., where he had lived since 1988, and was buried in the Shuhada Cemetery, Casablanca, Morocco, near his father's grave, thus fulfilling his last wishes. He took with him to the hereafter the secret of the last book he was working on.

== Literature ==
Driss Chraïbi published a number of novels which were written prior to and after Morocco's independence from colonial rule. As a result of this, his works were faced with extreme controversy with some going as far as to name him a traitor. His works often were based on the political events and can be used as a symbol of resistance to the French.

Chraïbi's most famous work was his debut novel Le Passé simple, published in 1954 at the heart of the fight for independence. This work was considered the most controversial work of the Generation of 52 and in turn was faced with heavy criticism and even threatened with death by the Democratic Independence Party (PDI). This controversy was because, unlike other Moroccan authors of the time, this novel attacked the Moroccan patriarchal society as much as it attacked the French colonial rule. Whilst Chraïbi denies the fact that the main character is himself, there are several parallel between the two. The novel explores the theme of identity as the protagonist struggles between his Moroccan heritage and the French colonial impact and education. Importantly it is written 2 years before Morocco gained its independence, therefore it was at the height of the struggle for independence.

La Civilization ma mère was another one of his novels, published in 1972 then later translated into English as Mother comes of Age which was published in 1984. It portrays the role of Arab women whose role in society is restricted to that of wife and mother. However, the novel is not limited to this, the novel has a powerful message for women's rights as the mother gains political, economic and social knowledge as she urges her sons. Then, she becomes a powerful spokesperson and an educator.

Chraïbi's later works provide more reflective views. An example of this is in his novel The World Next Door. Despite criticism of the west, particularly their colonial rule, throughout his novels he still understands the benefits of the freedom allowed in the west. For authors like him, there is complete freedom to publish and contest in western countries, something he knows is beneficial. Chraïbi's works were supported by former French President François Mitterrand who had personally thanked him for writing in French.

== Awards ==
He was awarded the Prix de l’Afrique Méditerranéenne in 1973, the Franco-Arab Friendship Award in 1981. and the Mondello prize for the translation of Naissance à l'aube in Italy. Ref : https://www.lemonde.fr/disparitions/article/2007/04/04/driss-chraibi-ecrivain-marocain_891743_3382.html

== Works ==
His first novel, Le passé simple was published in 1954. Its English translation by Hugh Harter The Simple Past, was reissued in 2020 by NYRB Classics, with an introduction by Adam Shatz.

Other works by Driss Chraïbi:

- The Butts (1955) - Les Boucs (1955; The Butts), translated by Hugh A. Harter, shifted the author's accusatory finger from a paternalistic Islamic formalism to the oppressed condition of many North Africans living in France.
- From All Horizons (1958). Title in French : De tous les horizons.
- The Donkey (1956) L'âne, and The Crowd (1961) La Foule; both confront the inadequacies of the newly independent Third World countries, as well as the failings of European civilization.
- Heirs to the Past (1962) Original title: Succession ouverte. The English translation by Len Ortzen was published by Heinemann in 1972.
- A Friend Is Coming to See You (1967). The weaknesses of Western values appear most noticeably in Un Ami viendra vous voir (1967; “”), in which Chraïbi combines the themes of insanity, violence, and the oppression of women.
- Mother Comes of Age (1972). Original title in French : La Civilisation, ma Mère!.... Translated into English by Hugh Harter.
- Mort au Canada (1975). "Death in Canada"
- Flutes of Death (1981) Original title : Une enquête au pays. English translation by Robin Roosevelt
- Mother Spring (1982) Original title La Mère du Printemps. English translation by Hugh Harter.
- Birth at Dawn (1986) Original title Naissance à l'aube. English translation by Ann Woollcombe.
- Inspector Ali (1991) Original title L'inspecteur Ali. English translation by Lara McGlashan.
- Une place au soleil (1993) "A Place in the Sun"
- L'Homme du Livre (1994). Translated into English under the title of Muhammad, a novel by Nadia Benabid, published by Lynne Rienner.
- L'inspecteur Ali à Trinity College (1996). "Inspector Ali at Trinity College"
- L'inspecteur Ali et la C.I.A (1997) "Inspector Ali and the CIA"
- Vu, lu, entendu (1998). Memoir, 1st volume. "Seen, read, heard"
- Le monde à côté (2001). Memoir, 2nd volume. "The world next door"
- L'homme qui venait du passé (2004). "The Man who came from the past"

Chraïbi also wrote several children's books.

== Death ==
He died in southeastern Drôme, France on April 1, 2007, and was buried in Casablanca.

== Bibliography ==
- Danielle Marx-Scouras, A literature of Departure: The Cross- Cultural Writing of Driss Chraïbi, Research in African Literatures, 23:2, pgs 131- 144, 1992.
- Hoda El Shakry, The Literary Qur'an; Tense Eruptions in Driss Chraïbi's Le passé simple, Fordham University Press, 2019.
- Hamid Bahri, Civilization and Otherness: The Case of Driss Chraïbi, Journal of Arts and Humanities, 3:1, 2014.
