= Fouad Laroui =

Moroccan economist and writer (born 1958)

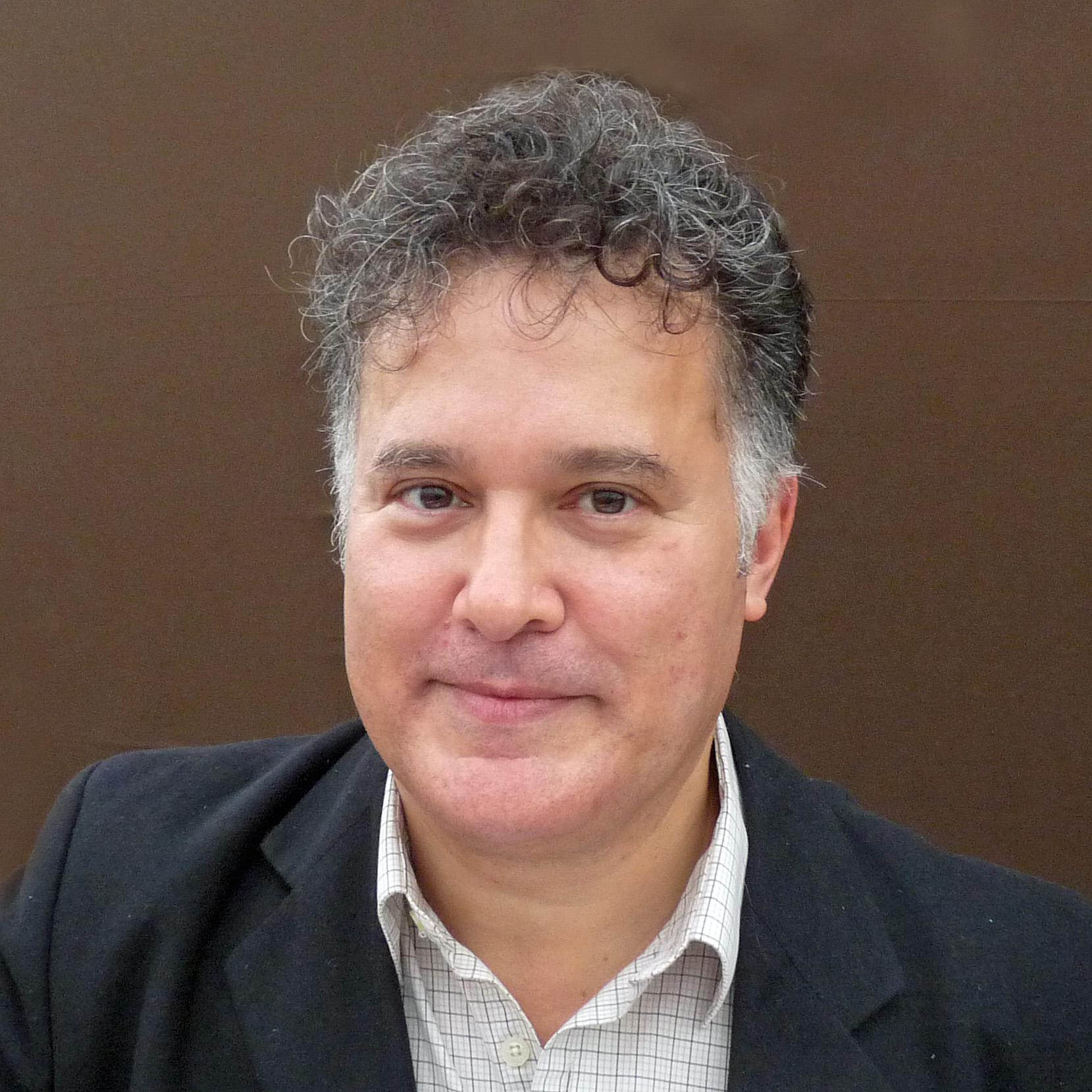
Laroui (2011)

Fouad Laroui (born 12 August 1958) is a Moroccan economist and writer, born in Oujda, Morocco. After his studies at the Lycée Lyautey (Casablanca), he joined the prestigious École Nationale des Ponts et Chaussées (Paris, France), where he studied engineering. After working shortly for the Office Cherifien des Phosphates company in Khouribga (Morocco), he moved to the United Kingdom where he spent several years in Cambridge and York. Later he obtained a PhD in economics and moved to Amsterdam where he started his career as a writer. He has published about twenty books between novels, collections of short stories and essays and two collections of poetry in Dutch. He has won several literary prizes, amongst which the Prix Goncourt de la nouvelle, the Prix Jean-Giono and the Grande Médaille de la littérature de l'Académie française.

He is also active as a literary chronicler for the weekly magazine Jeune Afrique and Economia magazine, and the French-Moroccan radio Médi1.

== Awards and honours ==
- 1997: Prix Découverte Albert-Camus pour son ouvrage Les Dents du topographe
- 1998: Prix Méditerranée des lycéens pour son ouvrage De quel amour blessé
- 1998: Prix BEUR FM Méditerranée pour son ouvrage Méfiez-vous des parachutistes
- 2002: Aux Pays-Bas le Prix E. du Perron pour son œuvre
- 2004: Grand Prix SGDL de la nouvelle pour son ouvrage Tu n'as rien compris à Hassan II
- 2005: Prix Grand Atlas pour son ouvrage La Meilleure Façon d'attraper les choses
- 2013: Prix Goncourt de la nouvelle for L'Étrange Affaire du pantalon de Dassoukine18.
- 2014: Grande Médaille de la francophonie de l'Académie française.
- 2014: Grand prix Jean-Giono pour Les Tribulations du dernier Sijilmassi
- 2018: Prix littéraire des lycéens du Liban pour son ouvrage Ce vain combat que tu livre au monde17

== Works ==
- Les Dents du topographe (Julliard, 1996) - A chronicle of a young person in Morocco, an account which marks the refusal of the established order and a feeling of detachment for his homeland. Price Discovered Albert-Camus.
- De quel amour blessé (Julliard, 1998) - The story of an impossible love affair between a Maghrebi living in Paris and a Jewish girl. Winner of Mediterranean prize of Colleges, Radio-Beur FM Prize .
- Méfiez-vous des parachutistes (Julliard, 1999)- A comic portrait of Moroccan society told through the lives of two characters.
- Le Maboul (Julliard, 2000) - A collection of satirical short stories about Moroccan society.
- La fin tragique de Philomène Tralala (Julliard, 2003)
- Tu n'as rien compris à Hassan II (Julliard, 2004) - A collection of short stories.
- De l’islamisme. Une réfutation personnelle du totalitarisme religieux (Robert Laffont editions, October 2006)
- L'Oued et le Consul (Julliard 2006) : collection of short stories.
- Le jour où Malika ne s'est pas mariée (Julliard 2009) : novel
- Une année chez les Français (Julliard 2010): Novel, listed for the Prix Goncourt 2010.
- Democracy and Islam in the Magreb an Implications for Europe, in: Zeyno Baran (Ed.), The Other Muslims: Moderate and Secular, New York: Palgrave Macmillan, 2010
- La Vieille Dame du riad (Julliard, 2011) : novel
- L'Étrange Affaire du pantalon de Dassoukine (Julliard, 2012) : short stories [The Curious Case of Dassoukine's Trousers (Deep Vellum, 2016)]
- "Des Bédouins dans le polder" (Le Fennec, 2010) - Moroccans in Holland: anecdotes, things seen, conversations overheard in the streets of Amsterdam and other Dutch towns.
- Des Bédouins dans le polder. Histoires tragi-comiques de l’émigration (Zellige, 2010).
- Une année chez les Français (Julliard, 2010) : roman qui a été retenu parmi la première sélection du prix Goncourt et an obtenu le Prix de l'Algue d'or (Saint-Briac-sur-Mer, France en 2011) 20108.
- Le Drame linguistique marocain (Zellige; Le Fennec, 2011) : non-fiction
- La Vieille Dame du riad (Julliard, 2011) : novel
- Le jour où j'ai déjeuné avec le Diable (Zellige, 2011) : chronicles
- L'Étrange Affaire du pantalon de Dassoukine (Julliard, 2012) : short stories
- Du bon usage des djinns (Zellige, 2014) : chronicles
- Les Tribulations du dernier Sijilmassi (Julliard, 2014) : novel
- Une lecture personnelle d'Averroès (Éditions universitaires d'Avignon, 2014) : non-fiction
- D’un pays sans frontières (Zellige, 2015) : non-fiction
- L’Oued et le Consul (Flammarion, 2015) : short stories
- Ce vain combat que tu livres au monde (Julliard, 2016) : novel. Prix littéraire des lycéens du Liban 201811
- L’insoumise de la Porte de Flandre (Julliard, 2017) : novel
- Dieu, les mathématiques, la folie (Robert Laffont, 2018) : non-fiction
- Plaidoyer pour les Arabes. Vers un récit universel (Mialet Barrault, 2021) : non-fiction
