= Aïn Sebaâ =

Aïn Sebaâ عين السبع
- Arrondissement of Casablanca
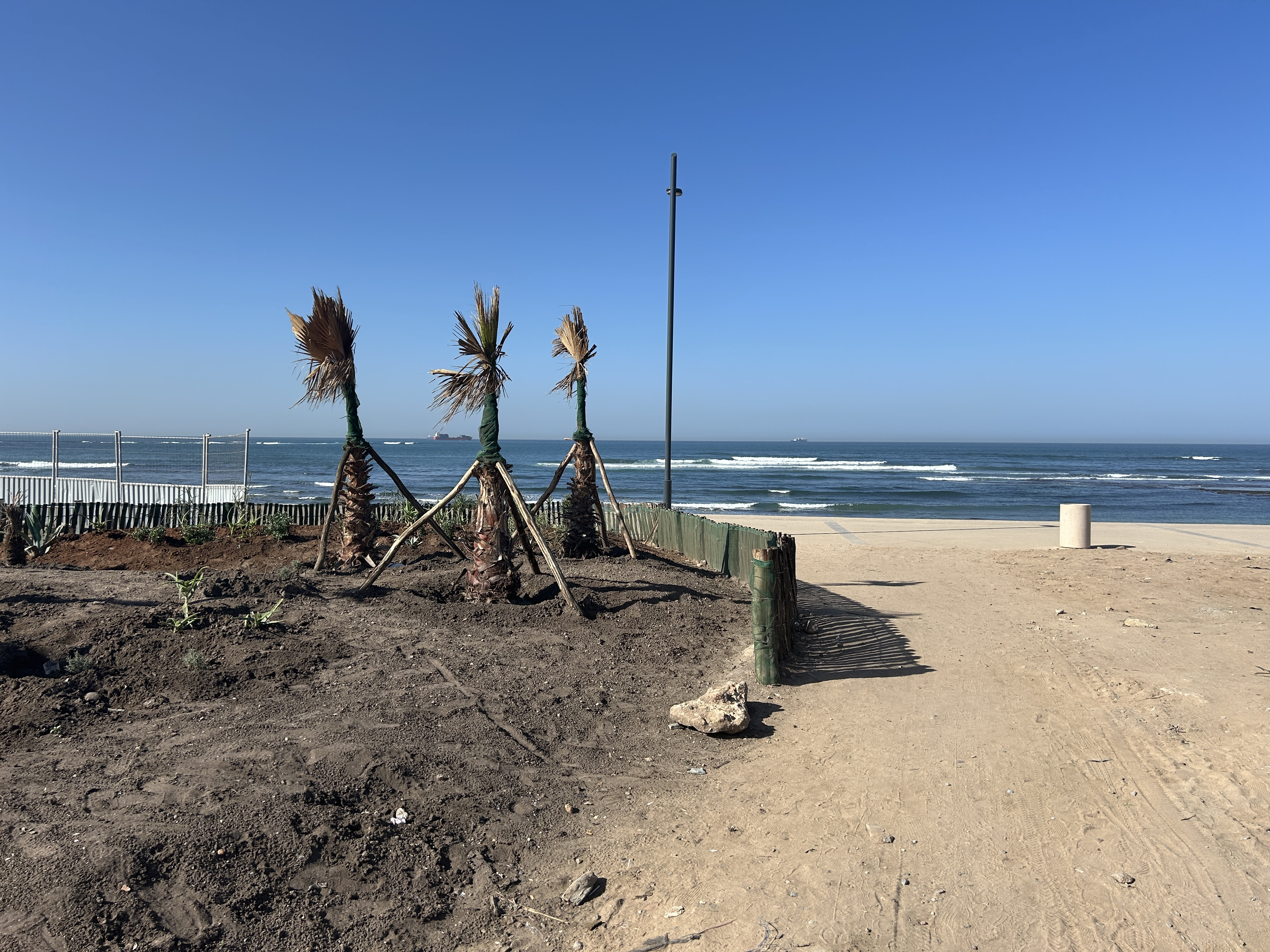
- Interactive map of Aïn Sebaâ
- Coordinates: 33°36′10″N 7°32′31″W
- Country: Morocco
- Region: Casablanca-Settat
- District: Aïn Sebaâ - Hay Mohammadi

Population (2004)
  - Total: 155,489
- Time zone: UTC+0 (GMT)

Aïn Sebaâ (Arabic: عين السبع) is an arrondissement of eastern Casablanca, in the Aïn Sebaâ - Hay Mohammadi district of the Casablanca-Settat region of Morocco. As of 2004, it had 155,489 inhabitants. An area on the road to Mohammédia, many major industrial conglomerates of Morocco are based here. 2M TV's headquarters can be found here.

== Education ==
The Groupe Scolaire Louis Massignon, a French international school, maintains its Aïn Sebaâ primary campus and its collège-lycée (junior and senior high school) in Aïn Sebaâ.

== Notable residents ==
- Abdelhak Aatakni - Olympic boxer
