= Vincent Timsit Workshop =

Vincent Timsit Workshop (VÉTÉ)
- Ateliers Vincent Timsit
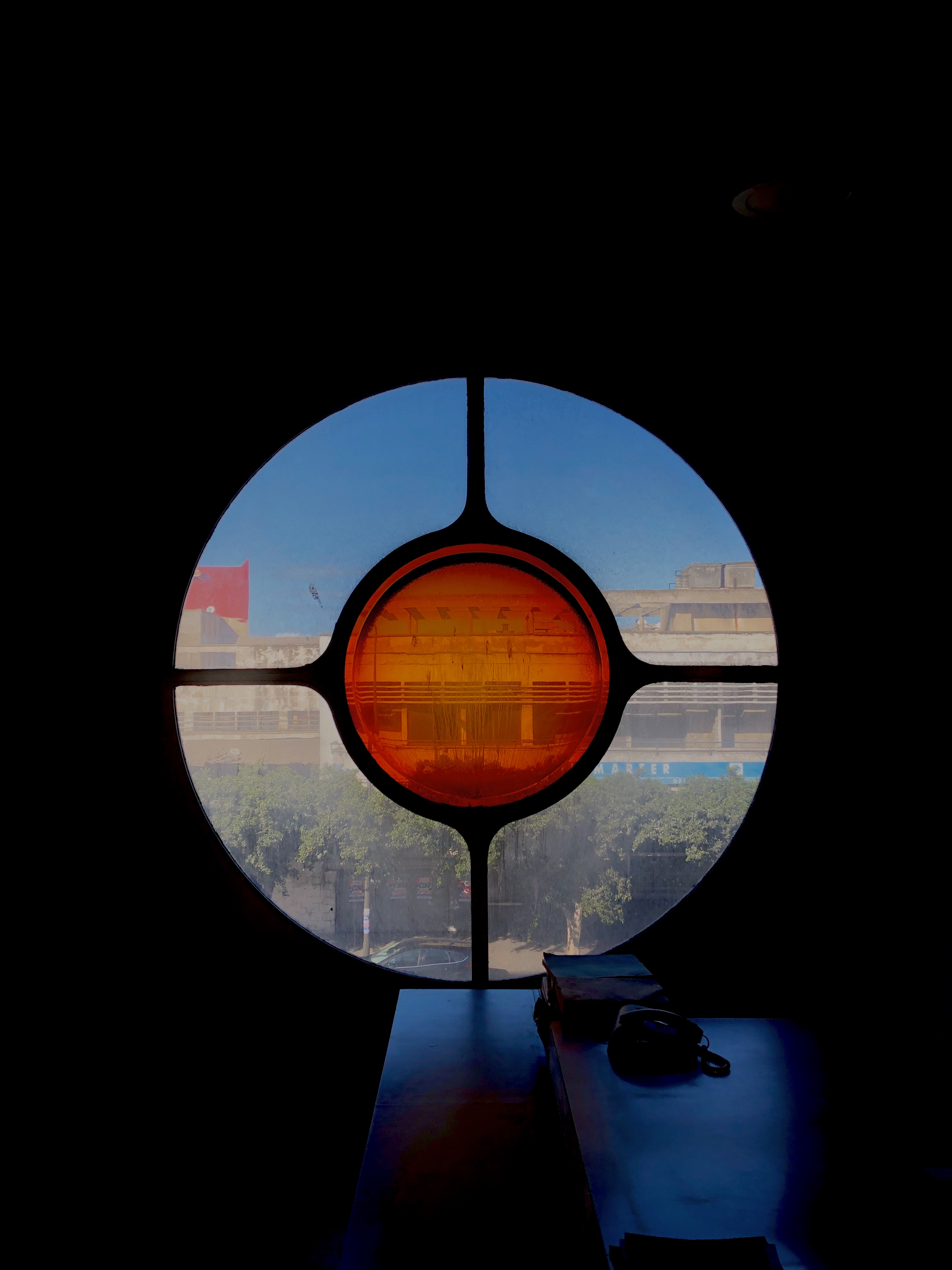
- Interactive map of the Vincent Timsit Workshop (VÉTÉ) area

General information
- Location: Casablanca, Morocco, Blvd. Moulay Ismail, Roches Noires
- Coordinates: 33.598218°N 7.578473°W

Design and construction
- Architect: Jean-François Zevaco

The Vincent Timsit Workshop (French: Ateliers Vincent Timsit), also known as VÉTÉ, is a complex designed by Jean-François Zevaco in Casablanca, Morocco in 1952. The complex contains workshops for the Vincent Timsit company, which was originally involved in mirror-making and locksmithing industries, as well as office space and an apartment. It is one of Jean-François Zevaco's most celebrated works, and it is considered an emblematic feature of the architecture of Casablanca.

== Architecture ==
In his design for the Vincent Timsit Workshop, Zevaco drew inspiration from Oscar Niemeyer with his use of flying parabolic arches.

== Gallery ==
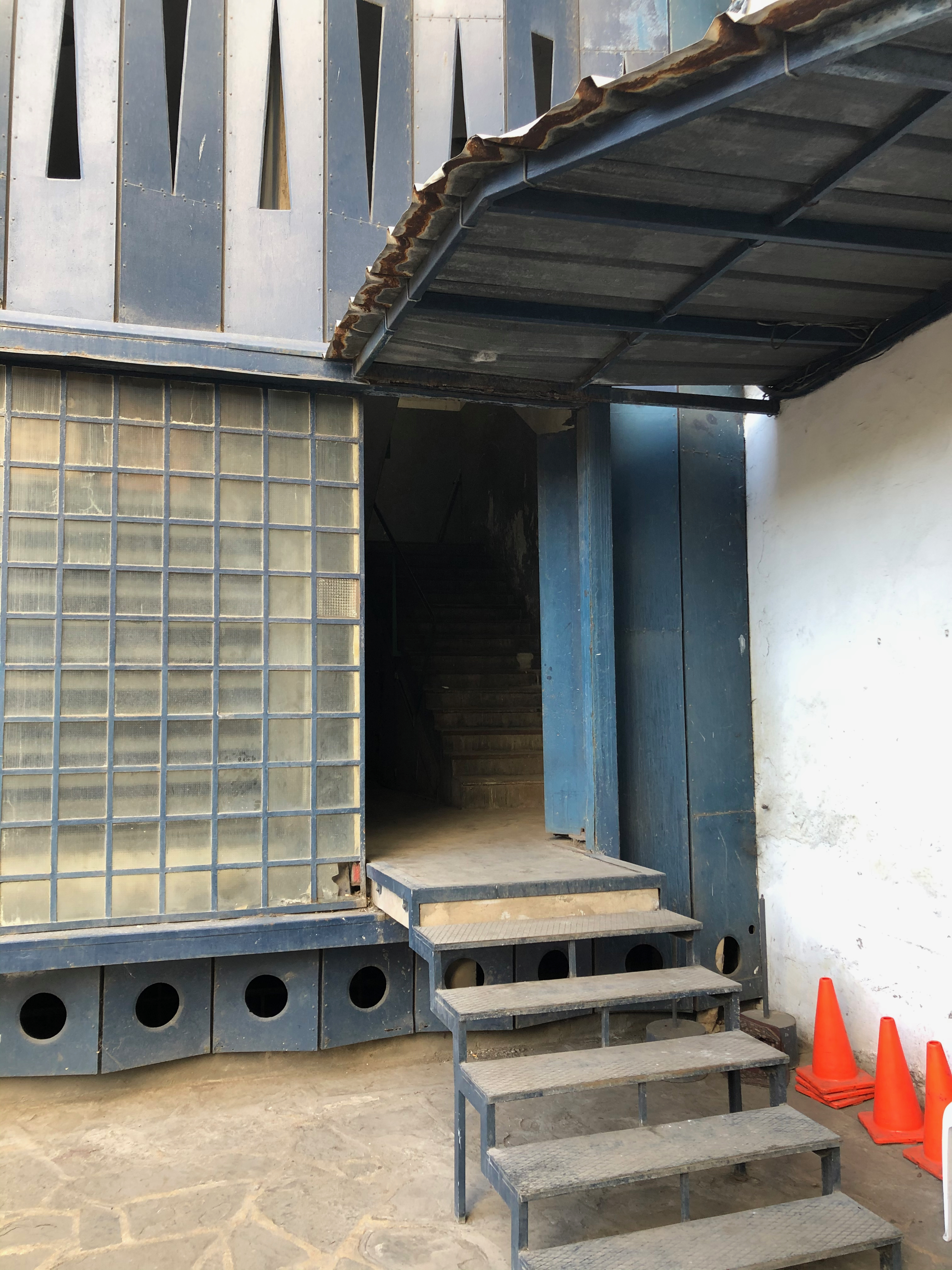

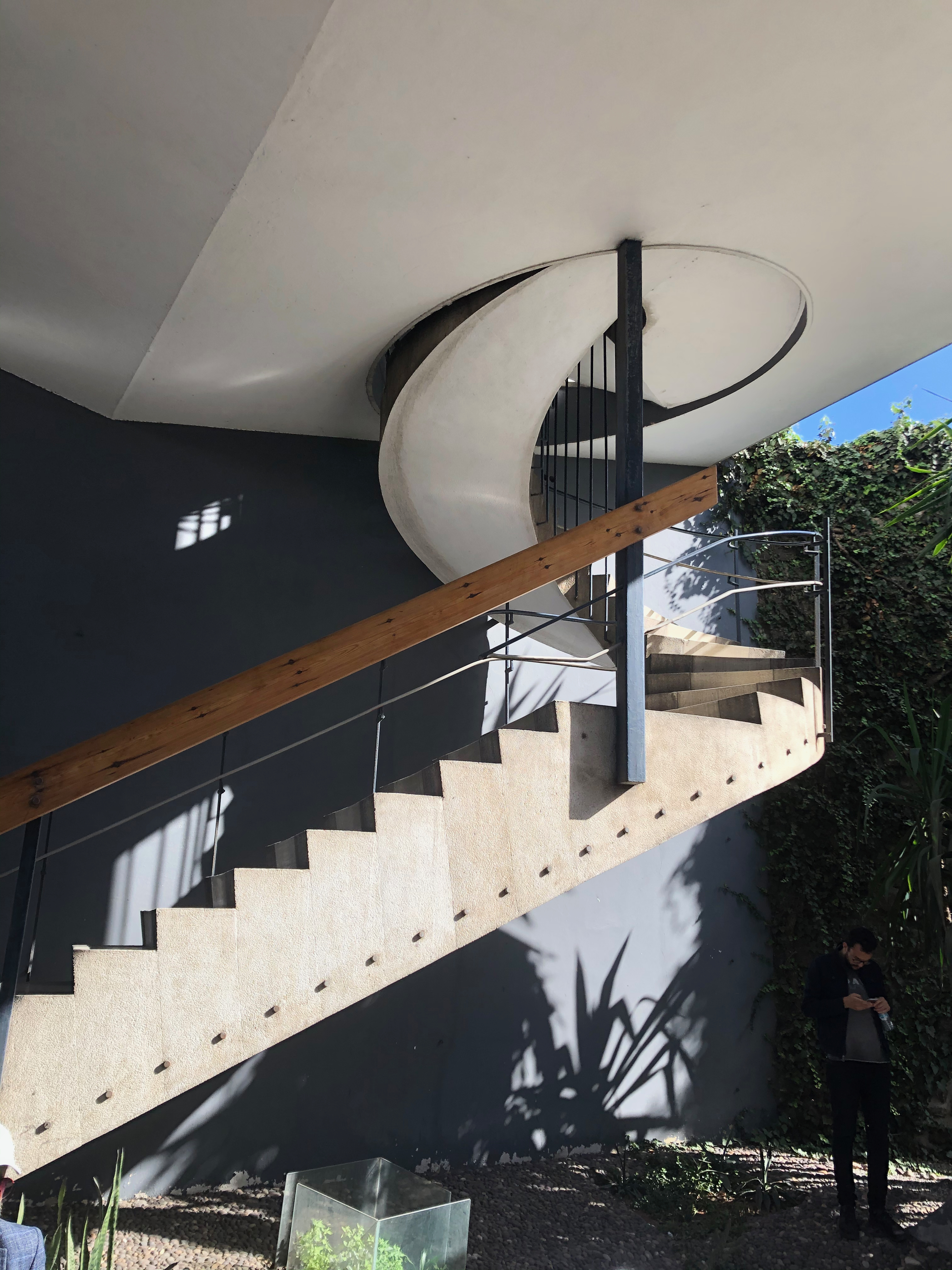

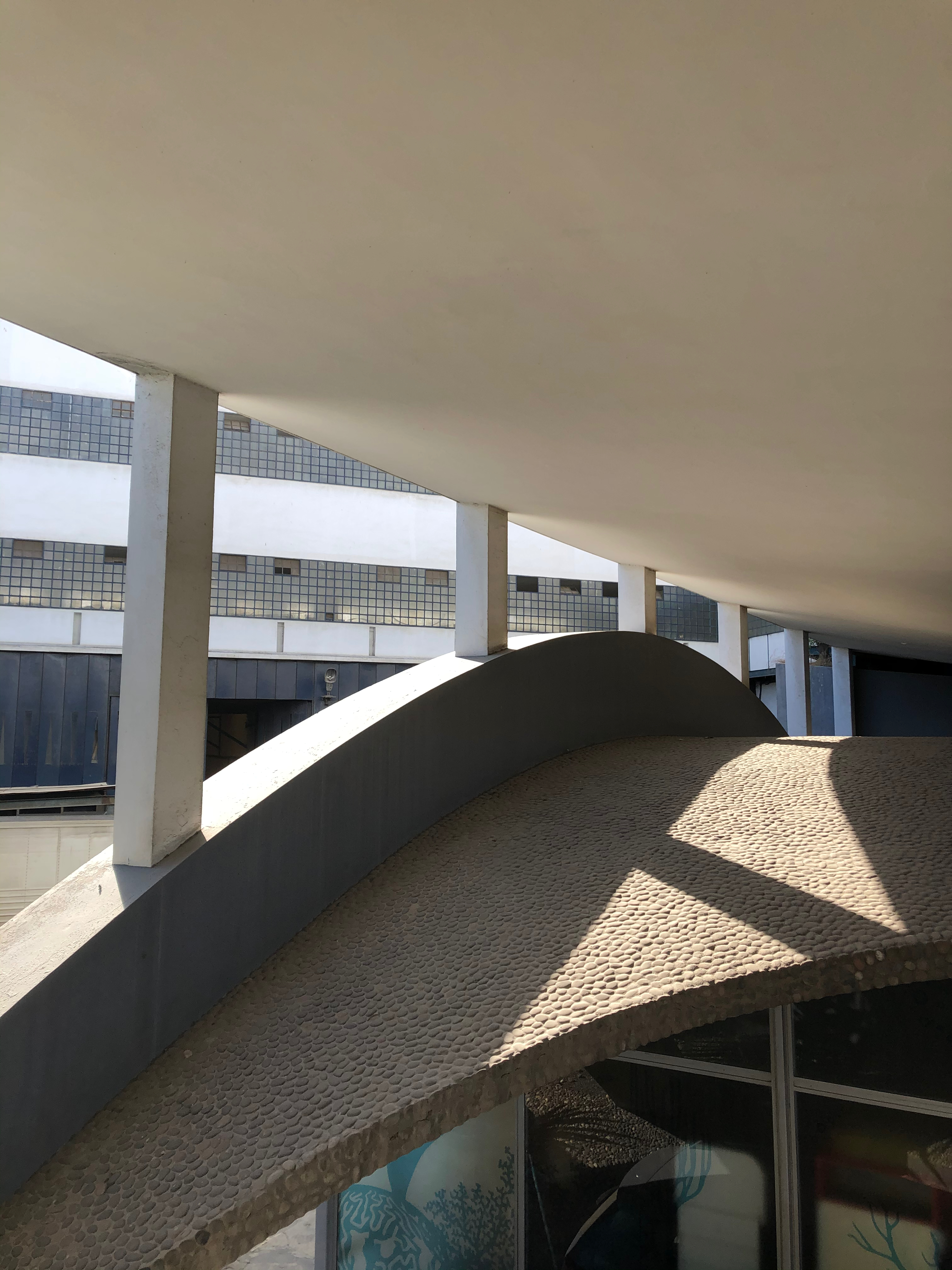

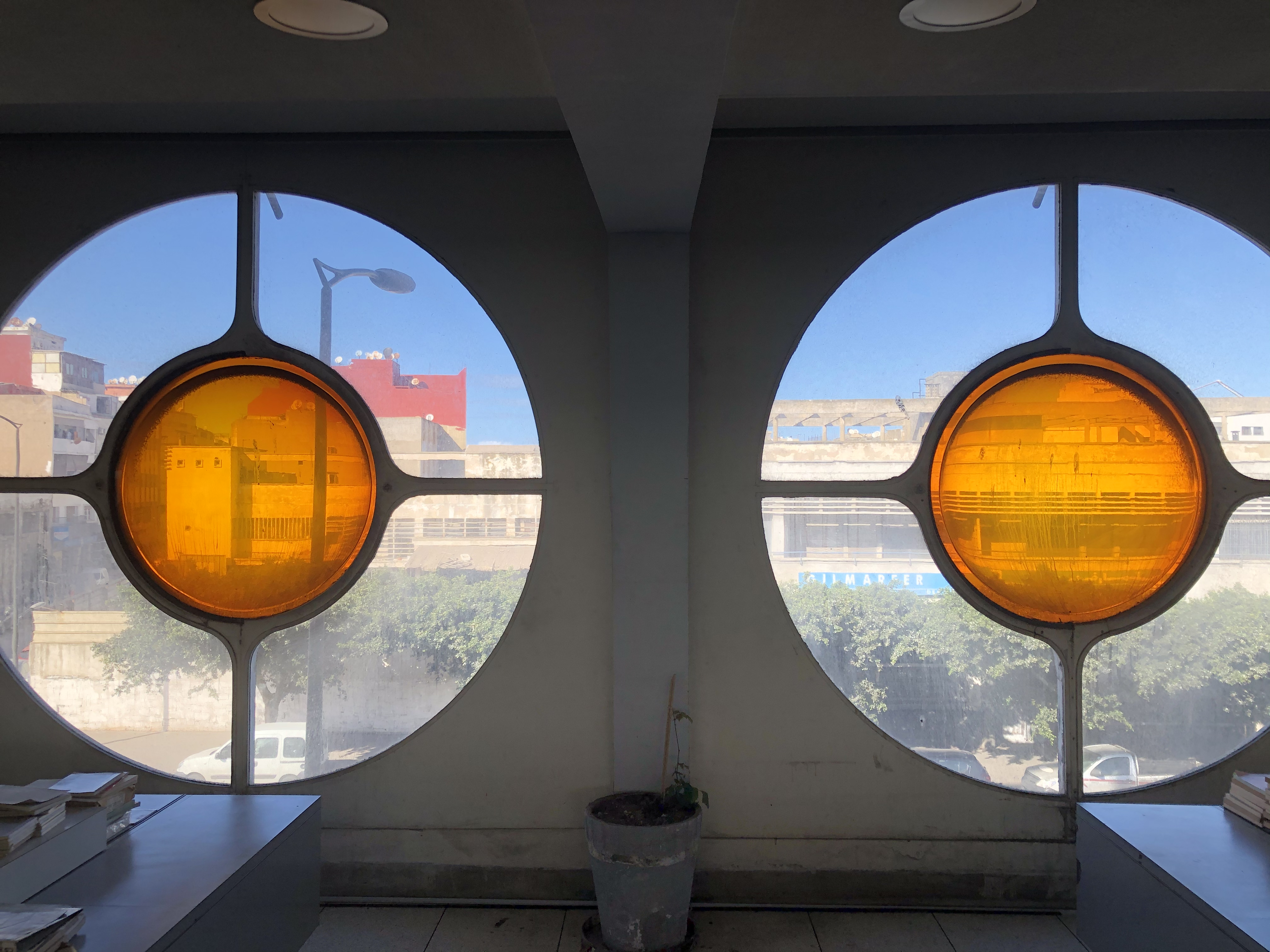

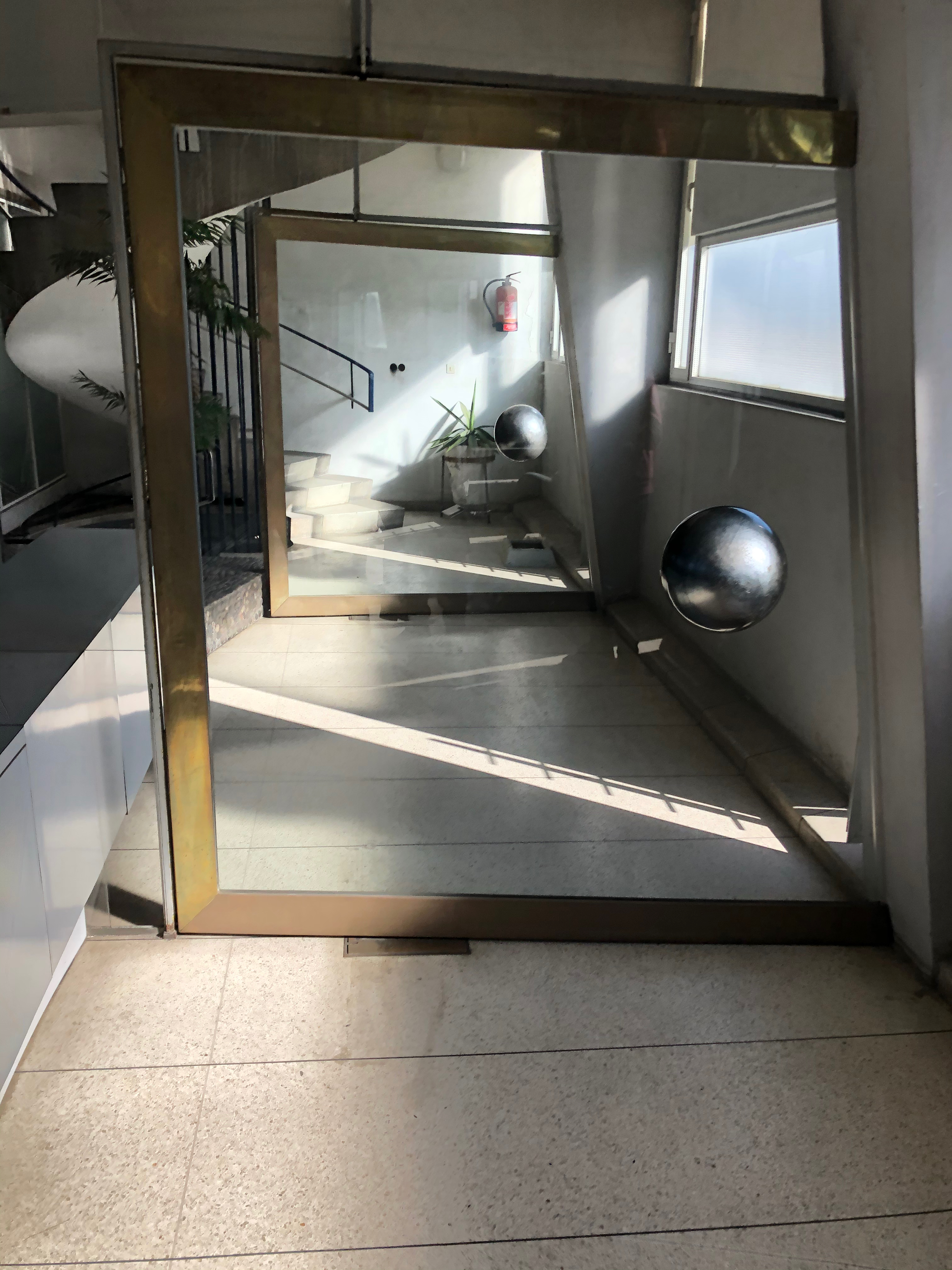

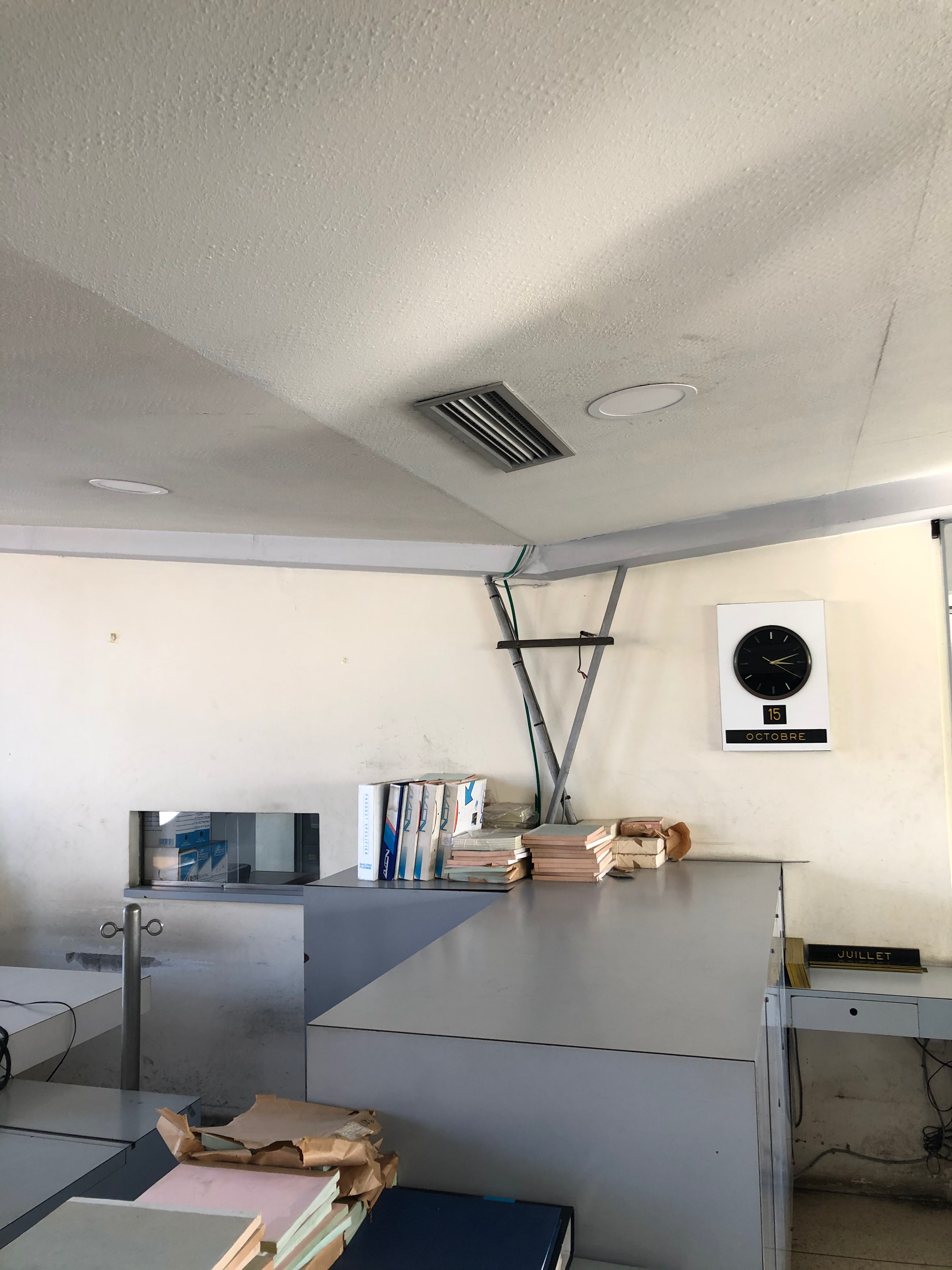

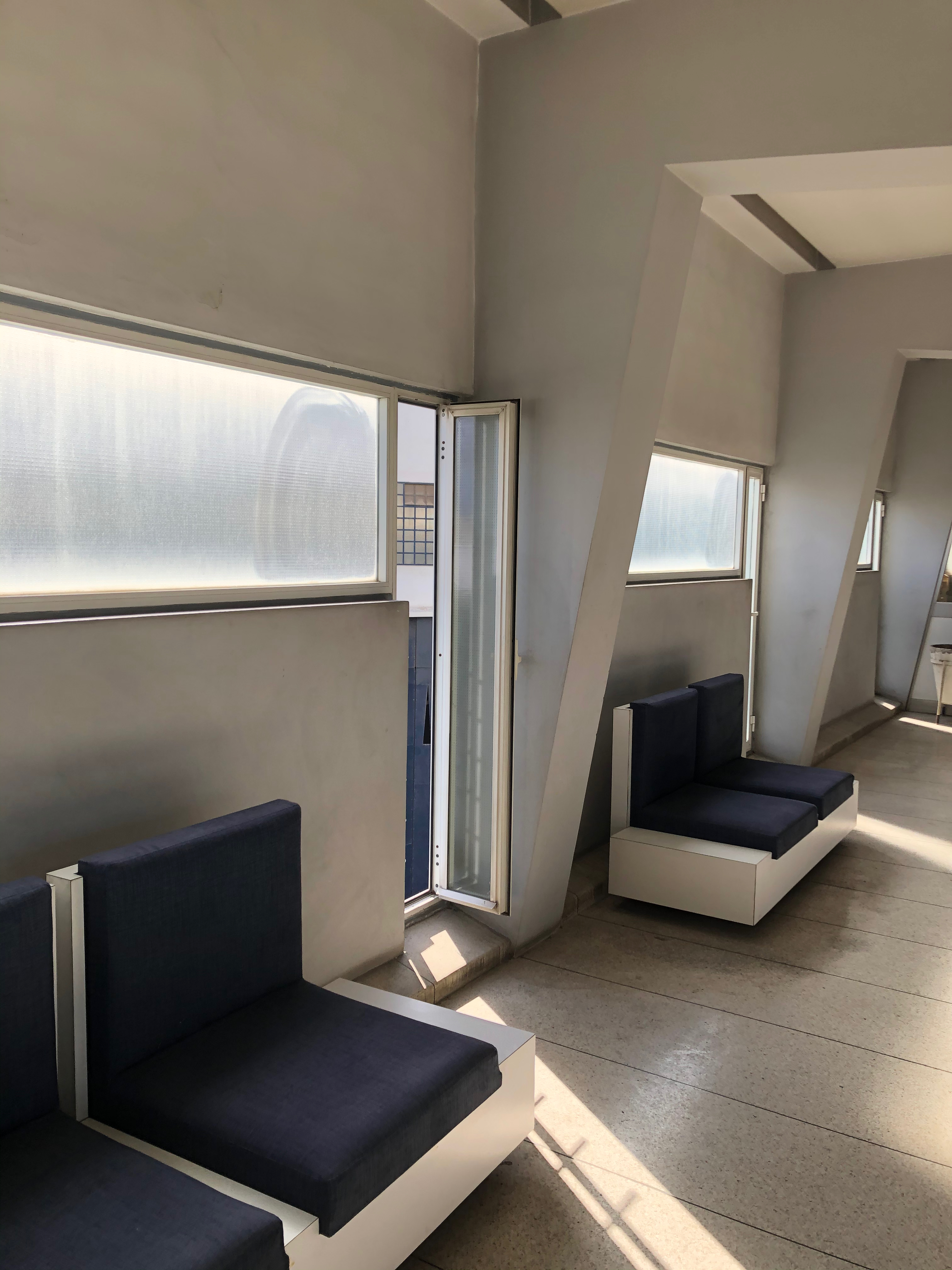
