= Moroccanization =

Moroccan national economic policy

Moroccanization (Arabic: مغربة, French: marocanisation) was a Moroccan domestic economic policy enacted by King Hassan II on March 3, 1973, in which major segments of the private sector were transferred to Moroccan ownership.

The French protectorate, established in 1912, brought an influx of European banks that, while presented as essential for economic growth, structurally integrated Morocco into an international capitalist framework without local autonomy. After independence in 1956, nationalist pressures led to the policy of Moroccanization aimed at achieving economic self-sufficiency.

The policy had the effect of "transferring to political loyalists and high-ranking military officers state-held assets, agricultural lands, and enterprises that were more than 50 percent foreign owned." Overnight, the portion of industrial enterprises in Morocco that were owned by Moroccans increased from 18% to 55%.

In the following period, from 1973 to 1977, the Moroccan economy grew at a rate of 7.3% annually, financed mainly with foreign loans.
