= Jean-Pierre-Dominique Zévaco =

Jean-Pierre-Dominique Zévaco CM
- Bishop of Tôlagnaro
- Church: Catholic Church
- Diocese: Diocese of Tolagnaro
- In office: 26 September 1968 – 24 April 2001
- Predecessor: Alphonse-Marie-Victor Fresnel
- Successor: Vincent Rakotozafy

Orders
- Ordination: 29 June 1959 by André-Jean-François Defebvre
- Consecration: 12 January 1969 by Gilbert Ramanantoanina

Personal details
- Born: 30 July 1925 Vico, Corsica, France
- Died: 25 July 2017 (aged 91) Fianarantsoa, Haute Matsiatra, Madagascar

Jean-Pierre-Dominique Zévaco (30 July 1925 – 25 July 2017) was a Catholic bishop.

Zévaco was born in France and was ordained to the priesthood in 1959. He was appointed bishop of the Diocese of Fort-Dauphin, Malagasy Republic, and served as bishop of the diocese until 2001. In 1989, the name of the diocese was changed to the Roman Catholic Diocese of Tôlagnaro, Malagasy Republic.
