= Tit Mellil =

Tit Mellil تيط مليل ⵜⵉⵟⵟ ⵎⵍⵉⵍ
- Municipality and town
- Interactive map of Tit Mellil
- Coordinates: 33°33′12″N 7°28′56″W
- Country: Morocco
- Region: Casablanca-Settat
- Province: Médiouna Province

Population (2024)
  - Total: 56,019
- Time zone: UTC+0 (GMT)

Tit Mellil is a town and municipality in Médiouna Province. It serves as a southeastern suburb of the city of Casablanca. It lies along National Route 9, 16.1 kilometres (10.0 mi) by road, southeast of downtown Casablanca. In the 2024 census, the commune recorded 56,019 inhabitants living in 13,927 households.

It is best known for the Casablanca Tit Mellil Airport.
