= The Simple Past =

Novel by Driss Chraïbi

- Author: Driss Chraïbi
- Original title: Le passé simple
- Translator: Hugh A. Harter
- Genre: Literary fiction
- Publisher: Éditions Gallimard, New York Review of Books
- Publication date: 1954
- Publication place: Morocco
- English publication date: 2020
- Media type: Print (hardcover)
- ISBN: 978-1-68137-360-7 2020 edition

The Simple Past (Le passé simple) is a French novel by the Moroccan writer Driss Chraïbi. It was first published by the Gallimard in 1954.

The novel received widespread attention, in Morocco and France, due to its controversial themes and defiant expression and was harshly criticized by conservatives in both countries alike, but today it is considered a classic.

== Plot ==
The novel follows the experiences of a young man called Driss who is sent to a French school in Morocco where he becomes an enthusiastic but innocent admirer of Western civilization. Yet his background is conservative. His father - The Seigneur ("The Lord") - enjoys respect and a high position in society due to his apparent "sanctity" as a traditional learned Muslim and as a successful merchant but under the surface of this there is a strong element of violence and tensions in the life of the a family with tragic consequences that succeed in turning Driss into a disrespectful, anarchic, destructive and rejected rebel.

The story is told in the first person by Driss and there is a clear element of the autobiographical in terms of the author's experience, even though the story is imaginary. The style and expression of the novel is explosive and direct but there is also humor and tenderness. Driss Chraïbi acknowledges William Faulkner's influence on him at the time he wrote it.

== Analysis ==
The main theme of the novel is the conflict between the values of the Western world and those of traditional Islam. and their impact on a personal level against a background of colonialism and the campaign for Moroccan independence. Other important themes include the place of women in Islamic society, individual freedom, and cultural identity in an age of change.

== Bibliography ==
- Chraibi, Driss (2020-01-07). Le Passé Simple [The Simple Past]. Translated by Harter, Hugh A. New York Review of Books. ISBN 978-1-68137-360-7.
