= Casablanca Tit Mellil Airport =

Airport in Morocco

Tit Mellil Airport مطار الدار البيضاء تيط مليل
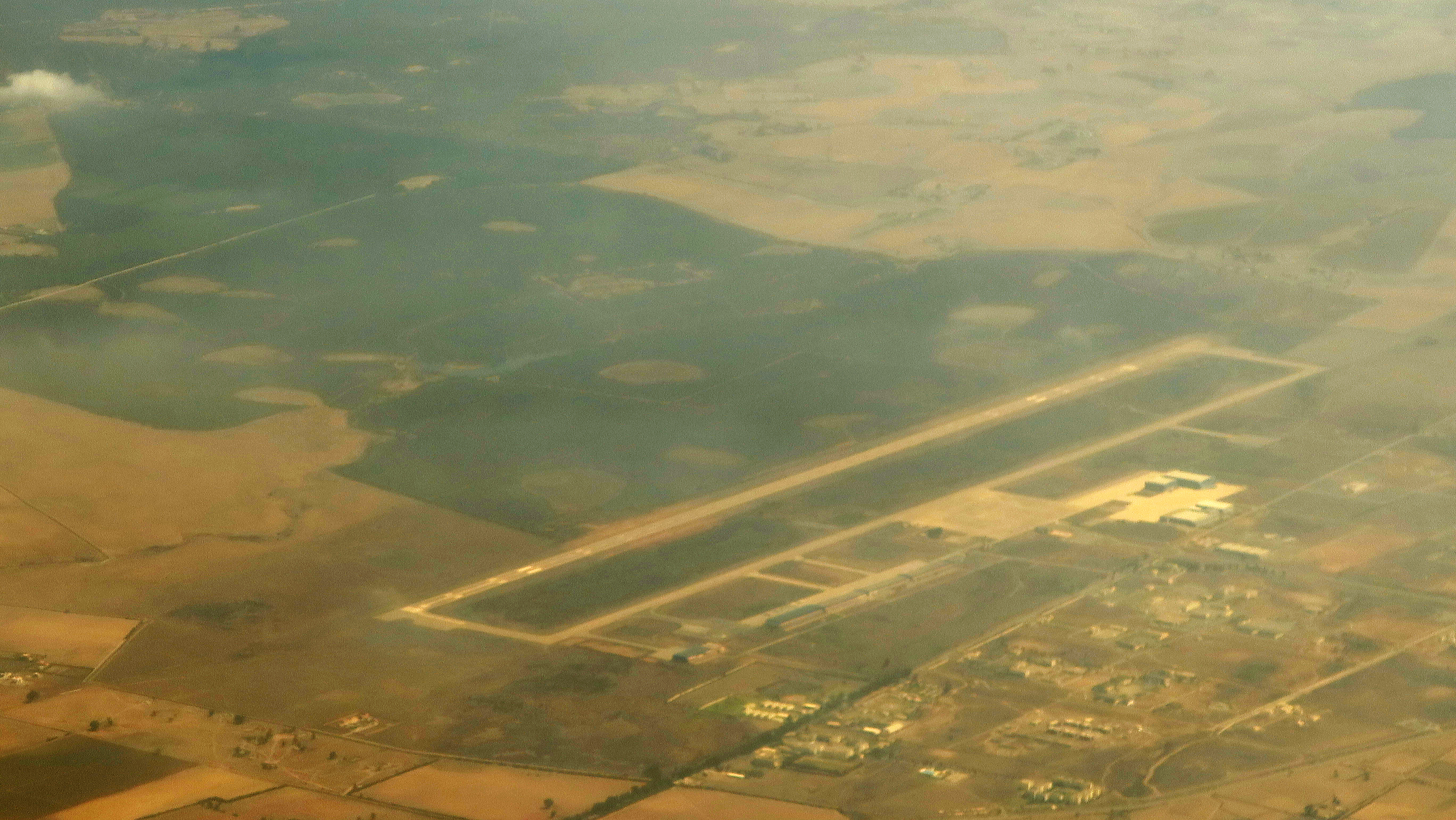
- IATA: none; ICAO: GMMT

Summary
- Airport type: Public
- Serves: Tit Mellil
- Elevation AMSL: 331 ft / 101 m
- Coordinates: 33°35′40″N 7°27′50″W

Map

Runways
Direction	Length		Surface
Direction	ft	m	Surface
18/36	3,700	1,127	Asphalt
- Source: Google Maps

Casablanca Tit Mellil Airport (ICAO: GMMT) (French: Aéroport Casablanca Tit Mellil, Arabic: مطار الدار البيضاء تيط مليل) is an airport located in Tit Mellil, Morocco, near Casablanca. It is a small airport less than 30 kilometres (19 mi) from Casablanca.
