= Lycée français international Louis-Massignon =

- ثانوية لويس ماسينيون
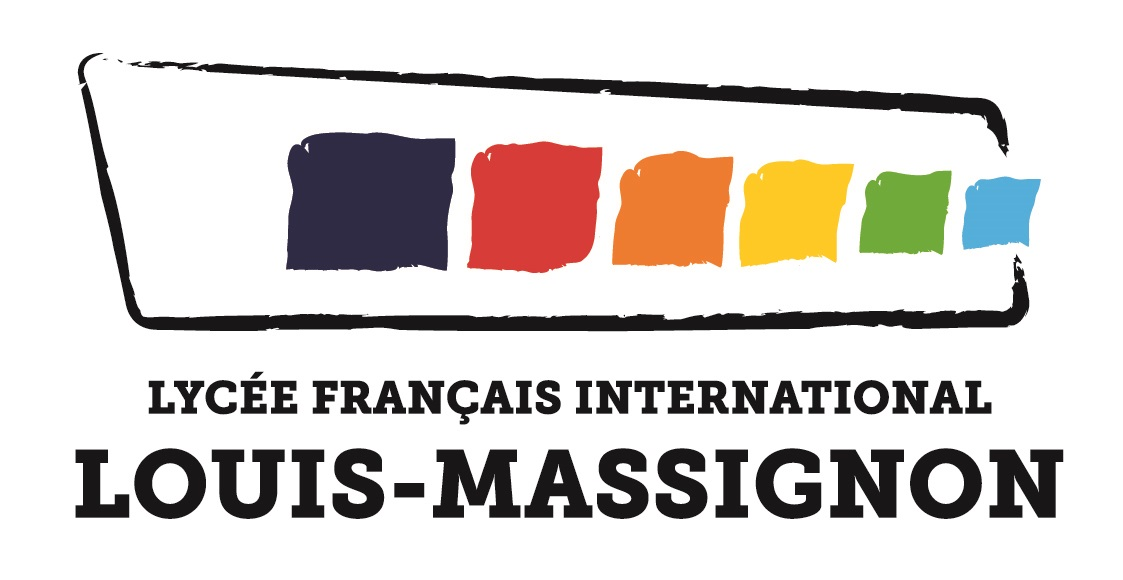

Location
- B.P. 6 Bouskoura Ville Verte; CP 27182 Casablanca; Morocco
- Coordinates: 33.478702°N 7.620388°W

Information
- Type: French International school
- Motto: Two cultures, three languages
- Established: 1996
- Principal: Catherine Bellus
- Grades: From Preschool to 12th Grade
- Enrollment: 4,359 (2017/2018)
- Language: French, English, Arabic
- Affiliation: Mission laïque française (since 1996)
- Information: OSUI School
- Exam Preparation: French national diploma, Baccalauréat, OIB (Arabic)
- Languages taught: French, Arabic, English, Spanish
- Language Certifications: English (Cambridge English), Spanish (DELE)
- Particularities: Three-language classes starting from the second year of Nursery school (French, English, Arabic)
- Website: lyceemassignon.com

The Lycée français international Louis-Massignon, previously Groupe Scolaire Louis Massignon, (Arabic: ثانوية لويس ماسينيون) is a French international school in Casablanca, Morocco. It was established in 1996 and is part of the Mission laïque française OSUI network. It serves levels maternelle (preschool) through terminale, the final year of lycée (senior high school) and it allows French, English and Arabic languages learning from preschool for all children. As of 2017 the school has about 4,400 students range from 3 to 18 years in four different campuses: Bouskoura, Aïn Sebaâ, Mers Sultan, Val d'Anfa.

== See also ==
- Agency for French Education Abroad
- Education in France
- International school
- List of international schools
- Mission laïque française
- Multilingualism
- Louis Massignon
