= Al Fida – Mers Sultan =

- District of Casablanca
- Interactive map of Al Fida – Mers Sultan
- Coordinates: 33°34′30″N 7°37′22″W
- Country: Morocco
- Region: Casablanca-Settat

Area
  - Total: 17.9 km^{2} (6.9 sq mi)

Population (2004)
  - Total: 332,682
- Time zone: UTC+0 (WET)
  - Summer (DST): UTC+1 (WEST)

Al Fida – Mers Sultan (Arabic: الفداء - مرس السلطان) is a district of Casablanca, in the Casablanca-Settat region of Morocco. The district covers an area of 17.9 square kilometres (6.9 square miles) and as of 2004 had 332,682 inhabitants.

== Subdivisions ==
The district is divided into two arrondissements and one municipality:

- Mers sultan Maarif, containing the municipality of Maarif, Casablanca|
