= Hakim Mouzaki =

Moroccan footballer

Personal information
- Full name: Hakim Mouzaki
- Date of birth: March 29, 1983 (age 43)
- Place of birth: Casablanca, Morocco
- Height: 1.84 m (6 ft 1/2 in)
- Position: Goalkeeper

Team information
- Current team: Wydad Casablanca
- Number: 22

Youth career
- 2003–2004: Wydad Casablanca

Senior career*
Years	Team	Apps	(Gls)
2004–	Wydad Casablanca	86	(0)
- * Club domestic league appearances and goals as of April 16, 2009 ‡ National team caps and goals as of October 17, 2008

Hakim Mouzaki (born 29 March 1983 in Casablanca) is a Moroccan footballer. He currently plays for Wydad Casablanca.
