= École française internationale de Casablanca =

French international school in Casablanca, Morocco

École Française Internationale de Casablanca is a French international school in Casablanca, Morocco. It serves levels primaire (primary school), collège (junior high school, opened in 2018) and lycée (senior high school, since 2021). It is a Cambridge International Examinations center.

EFI Casablanca is part of the Odyssey international school network, the leading private educational player specializing in French education abroad, supported by French institutions. The Odyssey Group was founded by education specialists who wanted to promote French school education around the world and to create a new educational group combining the best of French and international education.
