= Hay Salama =

Hay Salama is a quartier of Casablanca, Morocco. It has an unusual hexagonal grid of roads.
