= Hay El Hanaa =

Hay El Hanaa is a quartier of Casablanca, Morocco.
