= Structuralism (architecture) =

Movement in architecture

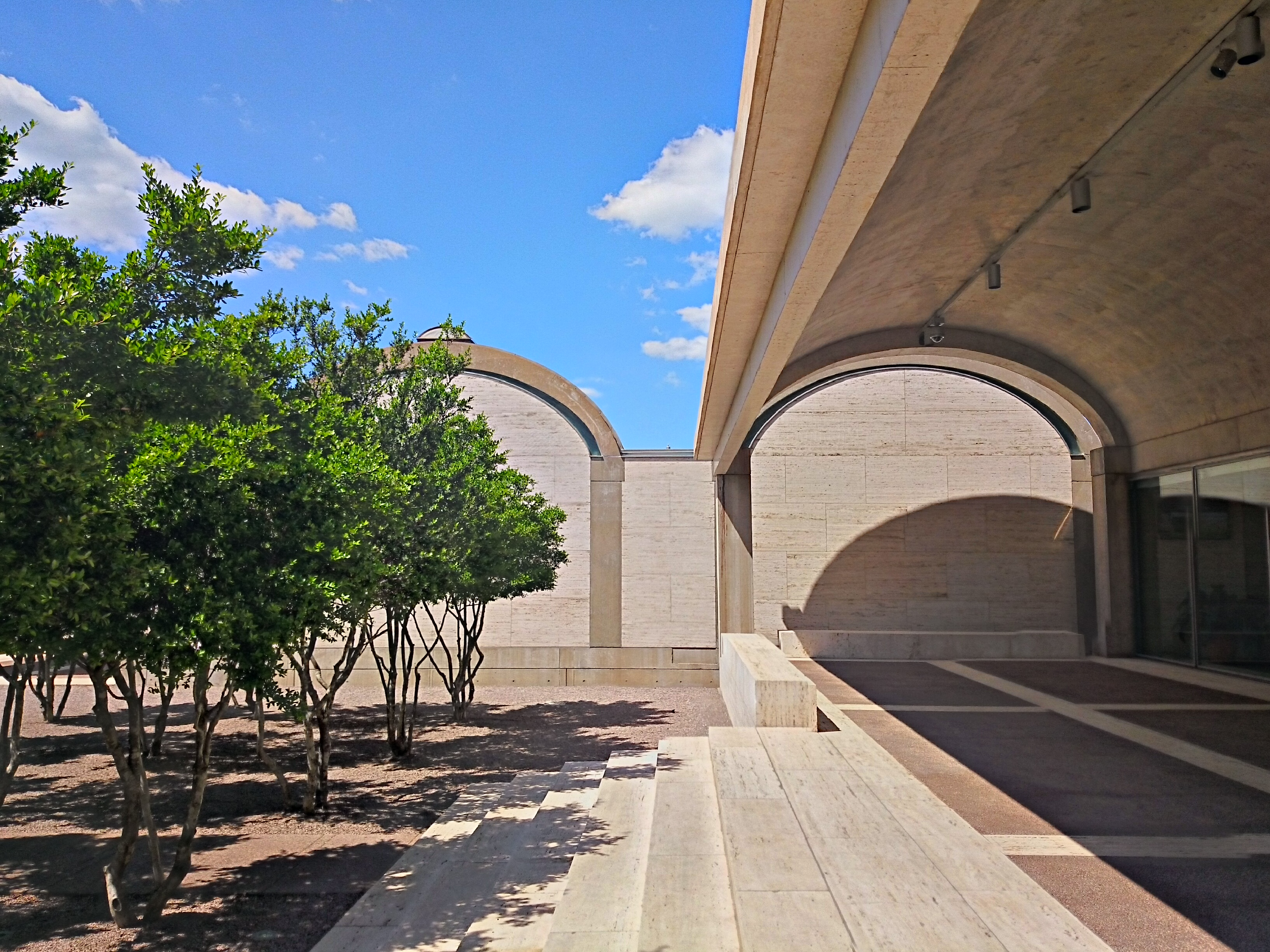
Kimbell Art Museum in Fort Worth, entrance area, 1972 (Louis Kahn)

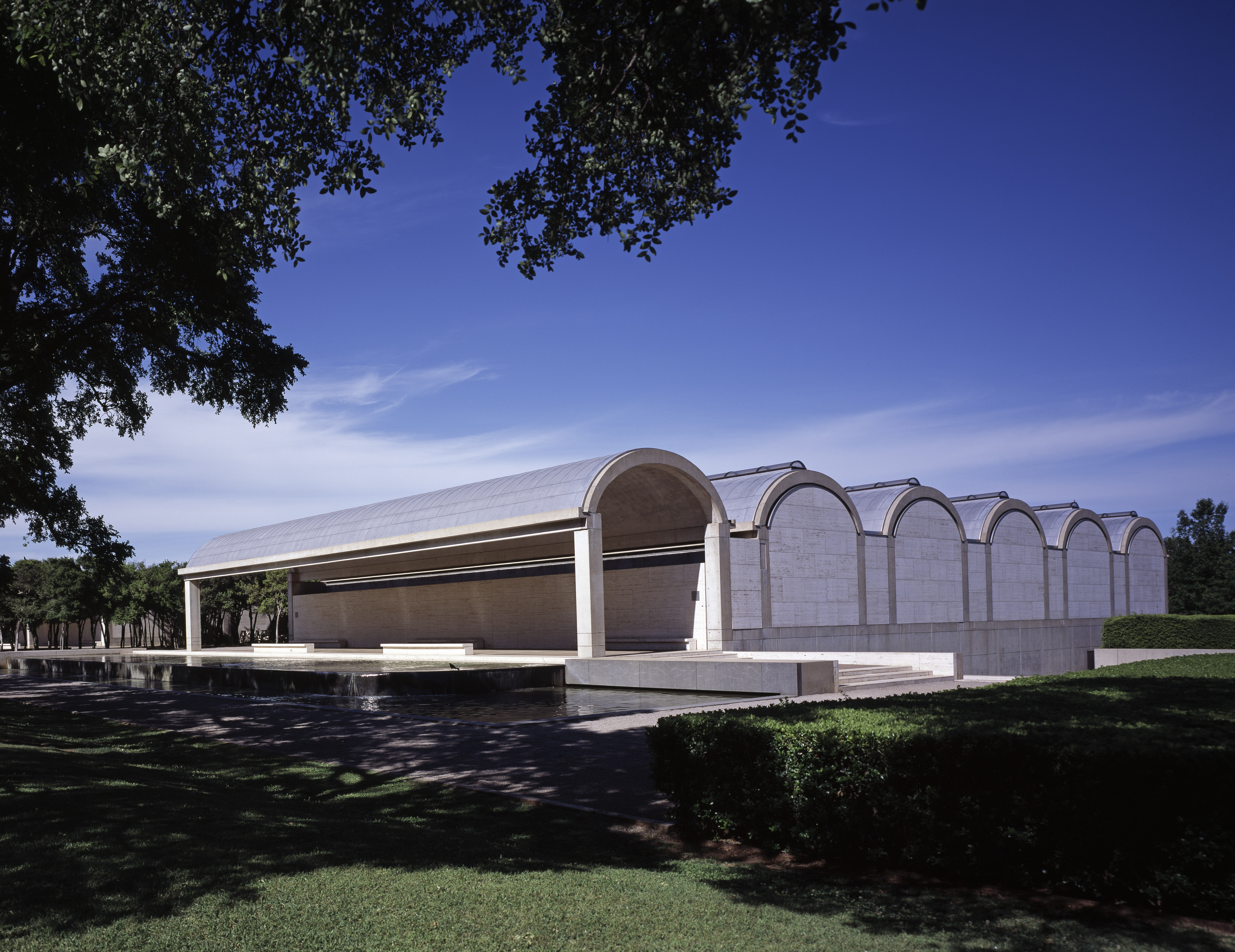
Kimbell Art Museum, 3 rows of building units (6+4+6) and 3 atriums

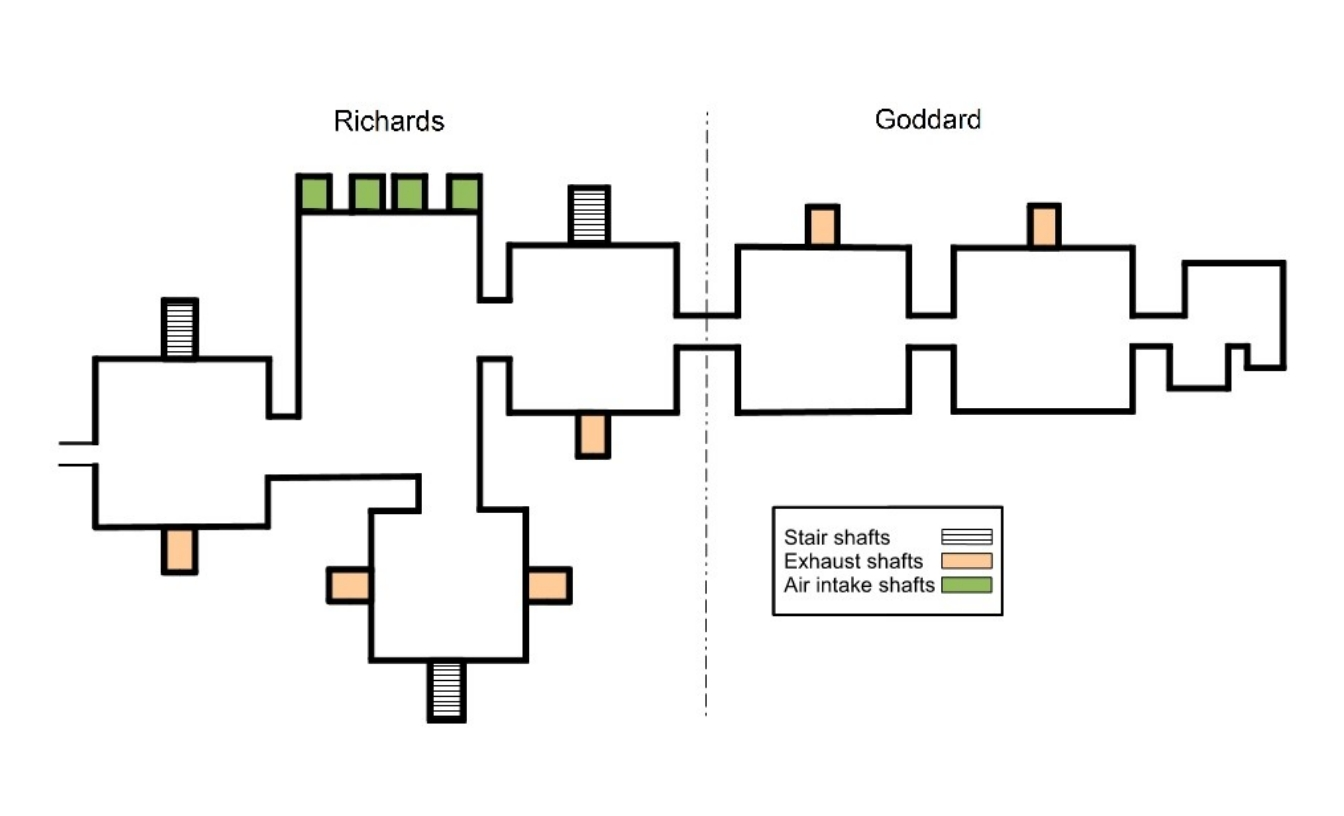
Medical Towers in Philadelphia, floor plan, 1960 (Louis Kahn)

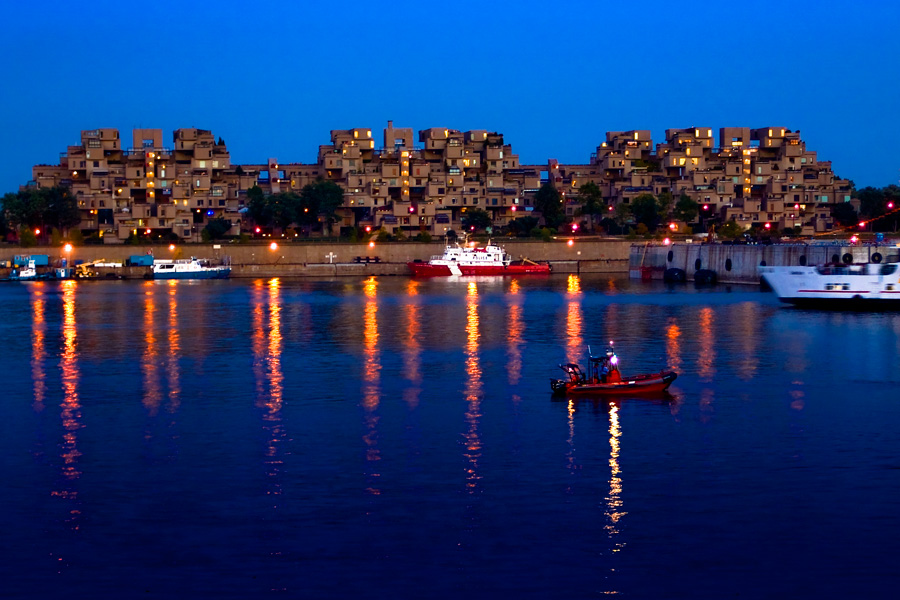
Habitat 67, Montreal World Exposition, 1967 (Moshe Safdie)

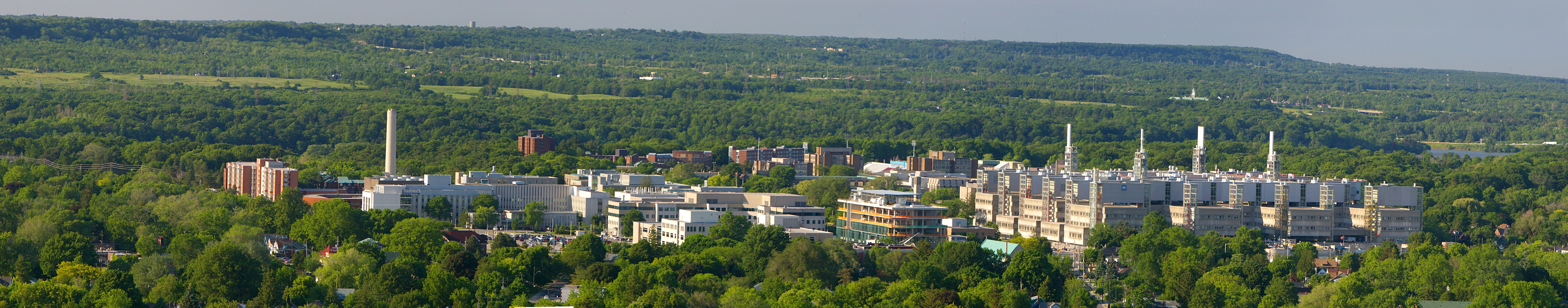
McMaster Medical Centre Hamilton Canada, 1972 (Craig Zeidler & Strong)

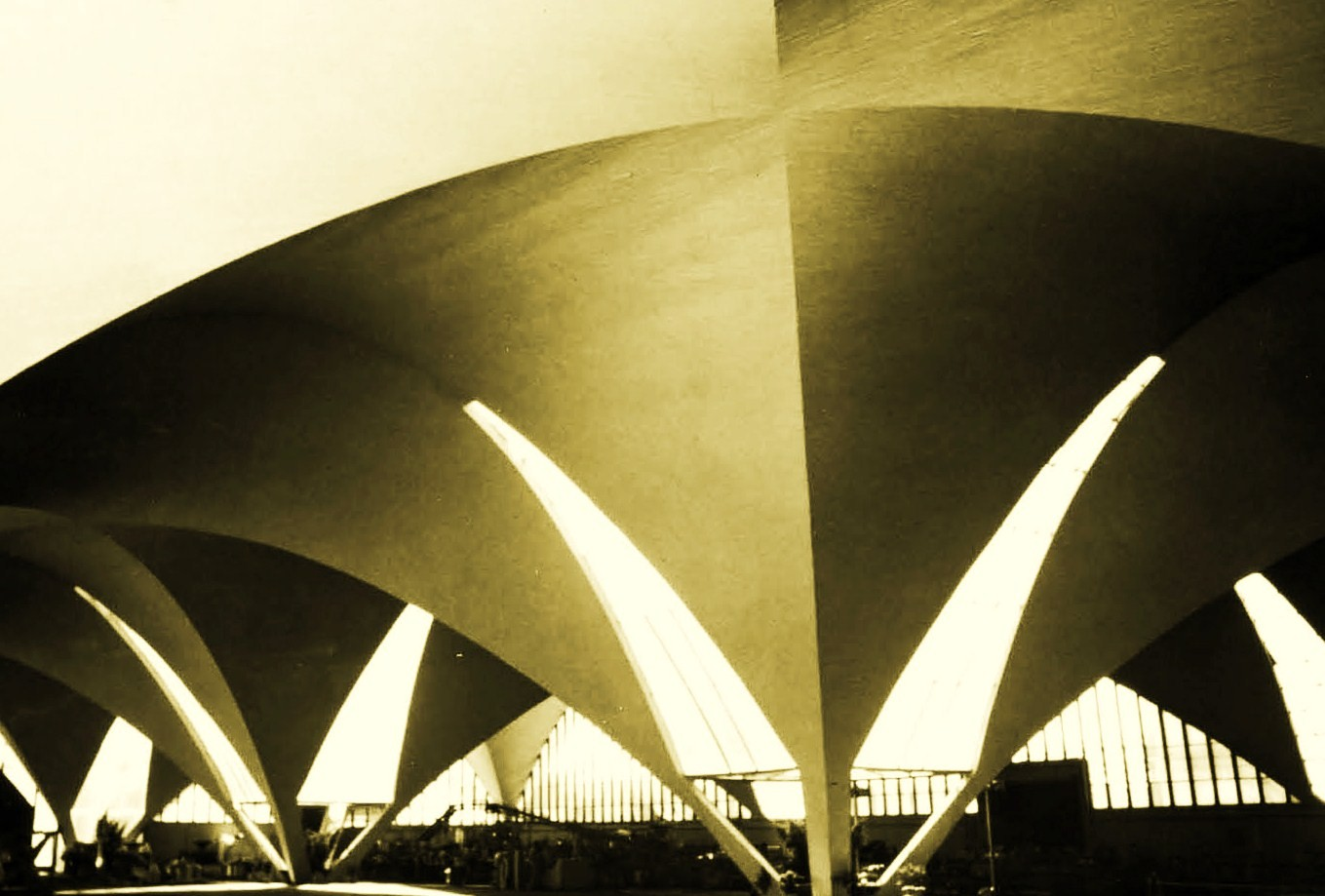
Bacardi-Factory in Cuautitlán near Mexico City, 1960 (Félix Candela)

Structuralism is a movement in architecture and urban planning that evolved around the middle of the 20th century. It was a reaction to Rationalism's (CIAM-Functionalism) perceived lifeless expression of urban planning that ignored the identity of the inhabitants and urban forms.

Structuralism in a general sense is a mode of thought of the 20th century, which originated in linguistics. Other disciplines like anthropology, psychology, economy, philosophy and also art took on structuralist ideas and developed them further. An important role in the development of structuralism was played by Russian Formalism and the Prague School. Roland Barthes, a key figure of structuralist thought, argued that there was no complete structuralist philosophy but only a structuralist method.

Dutch architects of structuralism did studies in a similar way as Claude Lévi-Strauss (anthropology) and were interested in the principle "langue et parole" by Ferdinand de Saussure (linguistics), especially for the theme participation.

At the beginning of the general article Structuralism, the following explanations are noted:

Structuralism is a theoretical paradigm emphasizing that elements of culture must be understood in terms of their relationship to a larger, overarching system or structure.

Alternatively, as summarized by philosopher Simon Blackburn:

Structuralism is the belief that phenomena of human life are not intelligible except through their interrelations. These relations constitute a structure, and behind local variations in the surface phenomena there are constant laws of abstract culture.

== Structuralism and Postmodernism ==
In Europe, structuralism had a strong influence on the theoretical debate up to the end of the late 1960s. In its endeavor to offer an alternative to classical modern architecture, it was paralleled by New Brutalism. By 1975, structuralist philosophy lost its predominant position in the humanities due to important social and political changes. In architecture, its position was undermined by the increasing popularity of postmodern architecture promoted by authors such as Charles Jencks, Robert Venturi and Denise Scott Brown. Structuralist ideas kept up to inform the work of important architects during and after the postmodern era, which is estimated to have ended by 1995.

The theoretical concepts of structuralism in architecture were developed mainly in Europe and Japan, with important contributions of the United States and Canada. Contributions in architectural magazines by Arnulf Lüchinger and his compilation of structuralist projects published in 1980 (Structuralism in Architecture and Urban Planning) introduced structuralism to a wider audience. Important assessments concerning structuralist theory in architecture have been made by Kenneth Frampton and Jürgen Joedicke.

In the 2010s, a new interest in structuralism in architecture can be detected, although it can be established that it is not paralleled by a revival of structuralism in the humanities. In 2011, a comprehensive scientific compilation of "structuralist activity" appeared in a publication called Structuralism Reloaded. In this extensive book, articles by 47 international authors were published about philosophical, historical, artistic and other relevant aspects. The following parts of this article are based on the current state of the publication Structuralism Reloaded.

A few months after publishing this book, the RIBA Institute in London discussed the new candidates for the RIBA Gold Medal in 2012. An actual question was: "Should the Venturis be given this year's RIBA Gold Medal?" Surprisingly enough, the RIBA-committee did not award the Venturis with their postmodernist view, and instead, gave Herman Hertzberger the prize for his structuralist architecture and theoretical contributions. The times had changed and a shift in emphasis had occurred. The comment of the former RIBA president Jack Pringle was: "The Royal Gold Medal, Britain's most prestigious award, should go to an architect that has taken us forward, not backwards." Today, postmodern architecture can be compared, to some degree with the architectural movement, Traditionalismus, in Europe.

== Various movements and directions ==
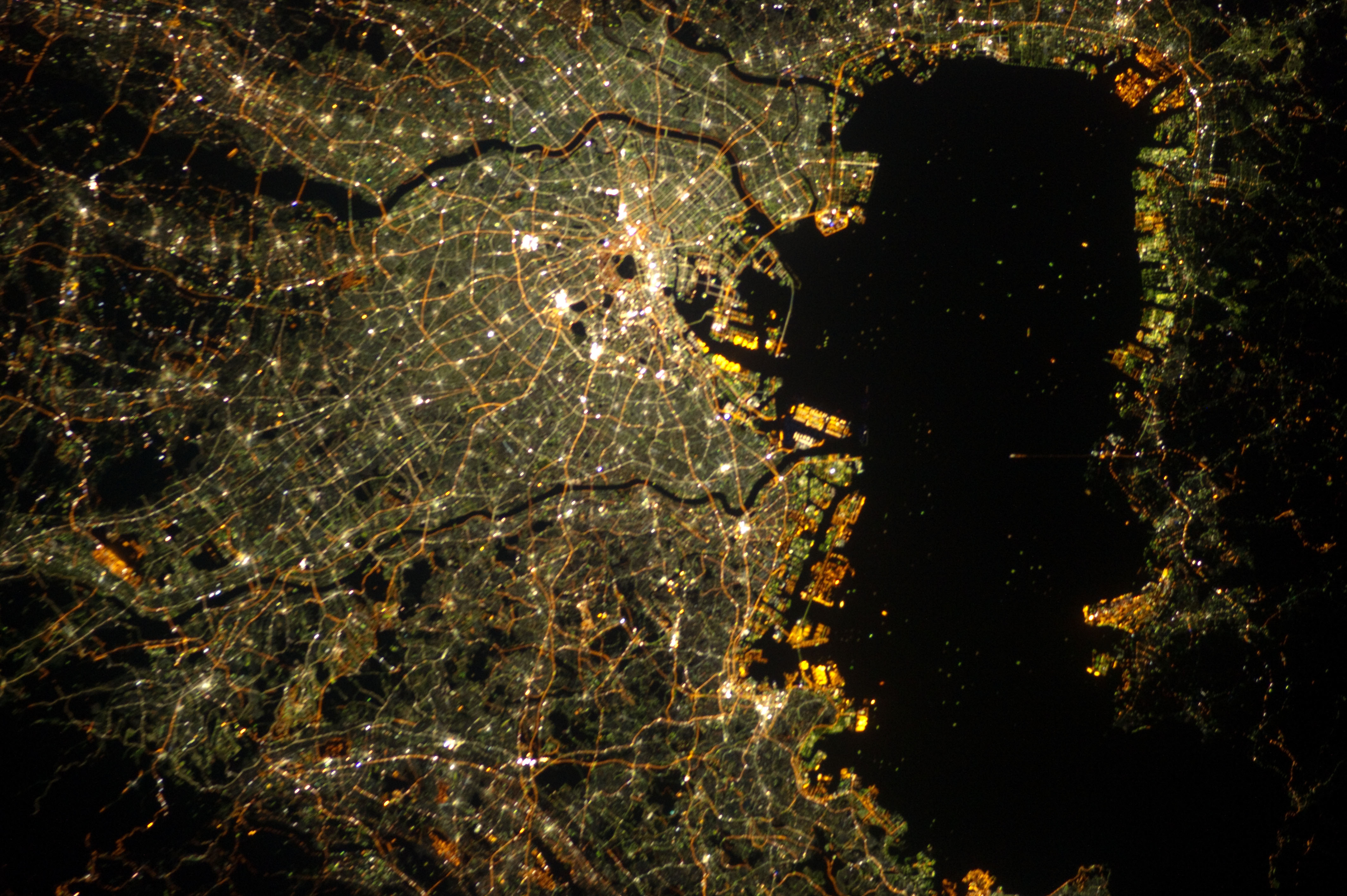
Tokyo Bay, in 1960 Kenzo Tange designed the structuralist Tokyo Bay Plan (ill. see Metabolism)

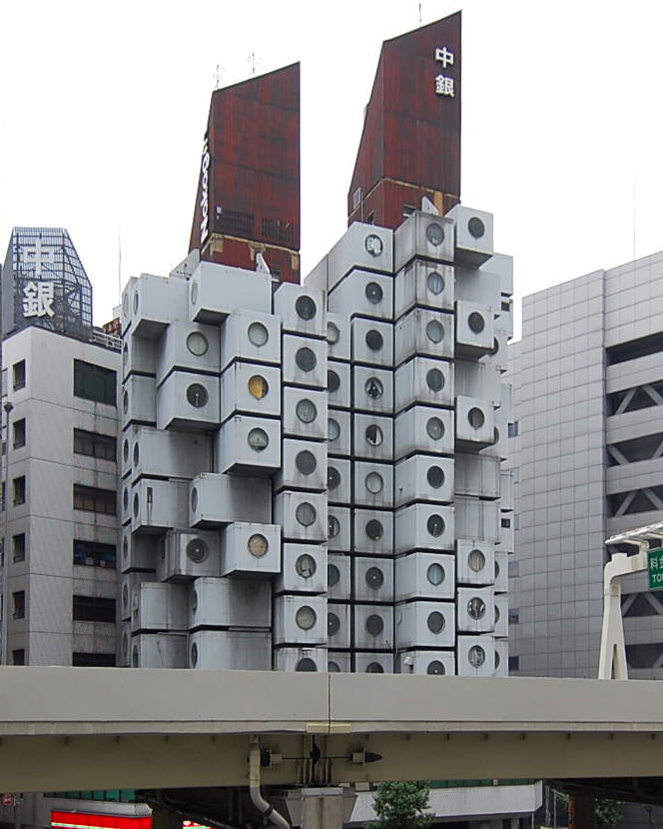
Nakagin Capsule Tower in Tokyo, Primary structure: two towers, secondary elements: capsules, 1972 (Kisho Kurokawa)

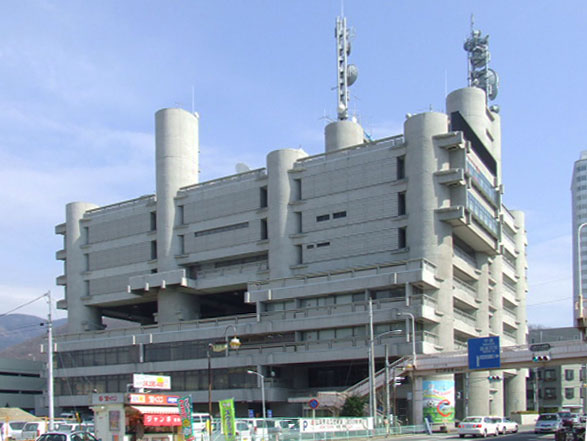
Yamanashi Culture Chamber in Kofu, Prototype of an interpretable, adaptable and expandable architecture, 1967 (Kenzo Tange)

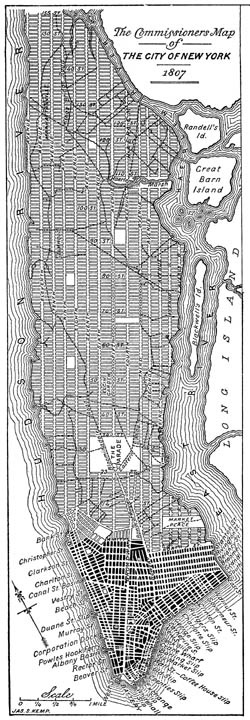
Manhattan: Gridiron plan 1807 and 2007, structure and infill, rule-based and interpretable

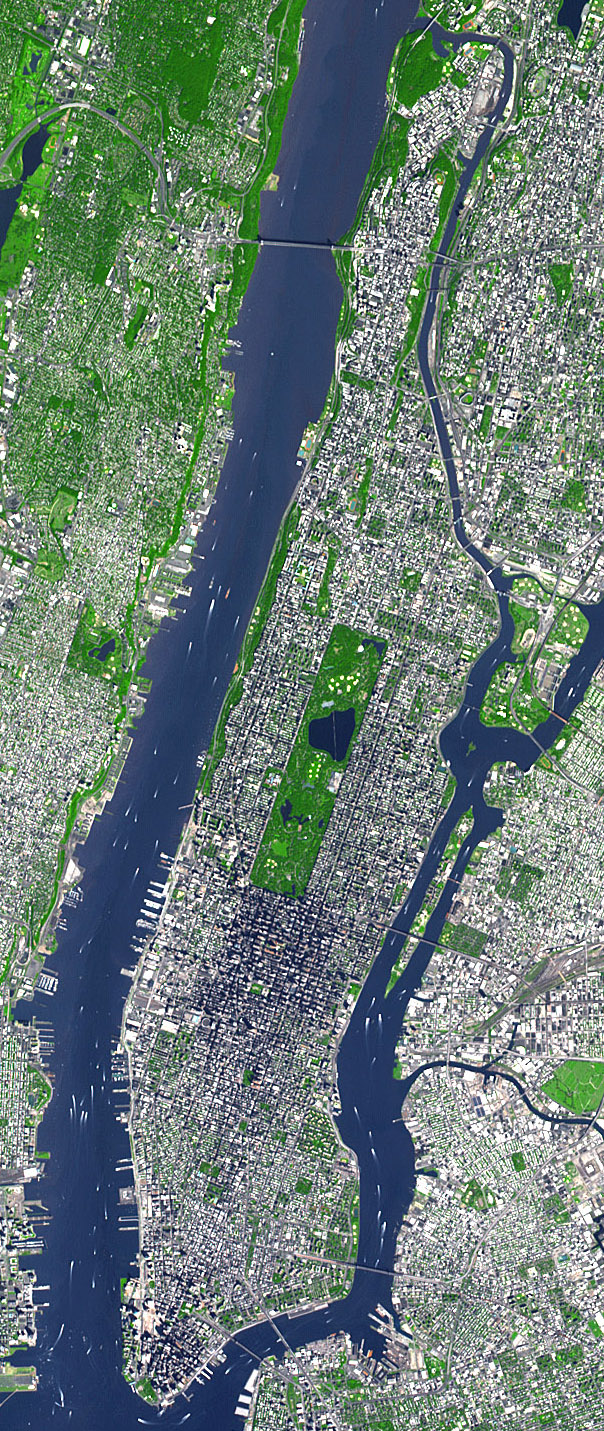

The anthropologist, Claude Lévi-Strauss, remarked: "I do not believe that we can still speak of one structuralism. There were a lot of movements that claimed to be structuralist." This diversity can also be found in architecture. However, architectural structuralism has an autonomy that does not comply with all the principles of structuralism in human sciences. In architecture, the different directions have created different images. In this article two directions are discussed. Sometimes these occur in combination.

On the one hand, there is the Aesthetics of Number which was formulated by Aldo van Eyck in 1959. This concept can be compared to cellular tissue. The most influential prototype of this direction is the orphanage in Amsterdam by Aldo van Eyck, completed in 1960. The "Aesthetics of Number" can also be described as "Spatial Configurations in Architecture" or "Mat-Building" (Alison Smithson).

On the other hand, there is the Architecture of Lively Variety (Structure and Infill) which was formulated for user participation in housing by John Habraken in 1961. Also, in the 1960s, many well-known utopian projects were based on the principle of "Structure and infill". An influential prototype of this direction is the Yamanashi Culture Chamber in Kofu by Kenzo Tange, completed in 1967. In relation to housing projects with participation Herman Hertzberger used the terms "Architecture as half-product" or "Open structures" and Alejandro Aravena the terms "Participatory design process", "Incremental housing" and "Half-houses".

== Origins ==
Structuralism in architecture and urban planning had its origins in the Congrès International d'Architecture Moderne (CIAM) after World War II. Between 1928 and 1959, the CIAM was an important platform for the discussion of architecture and urbanism. Various groups with often conflicting views were active in this organization; for example, members with a scientific approach to architecture without aesthetic premises (Rationalists), members who regarded architecture as an art form (Le Corbusier), members who were proponents of high- or low-rise building (Ernst May), members supporting a course of reform after World War II (Team 10), members of the old guard and so on. Individual members of the small splinter group Team 10 laid the foundations for Structuralism. The influence of this team was later interpreted by second generation protagonist Herman Hertzberger when he said: "I am a product of Team 10." As a group of avant-garde architects, Team 10 was active from 1953 to 1981, and two different movements emerged from it: the New Brutalism of the English members (Alison and Peter Smithson) and the Structuralism of the Dutch members (Aldo van Eyck and Jacob Bakema).

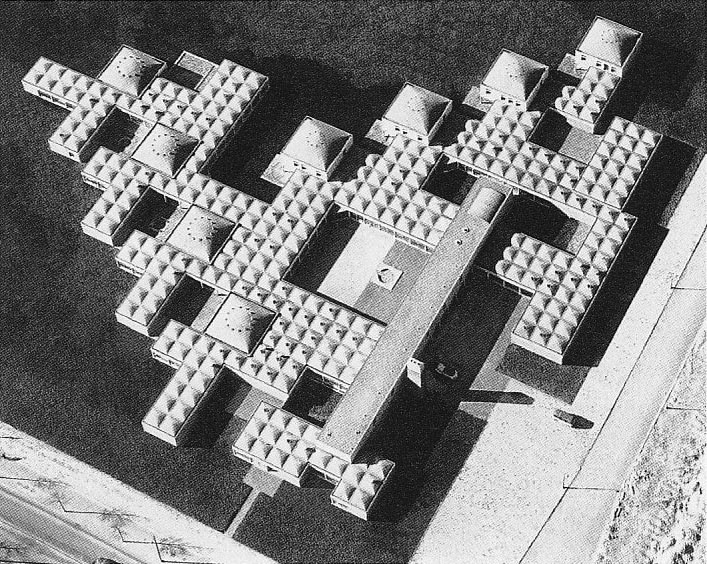
Orphanage in Amsterdam, "Dutch Structuralism", 1960 (Aldo van Eyck)

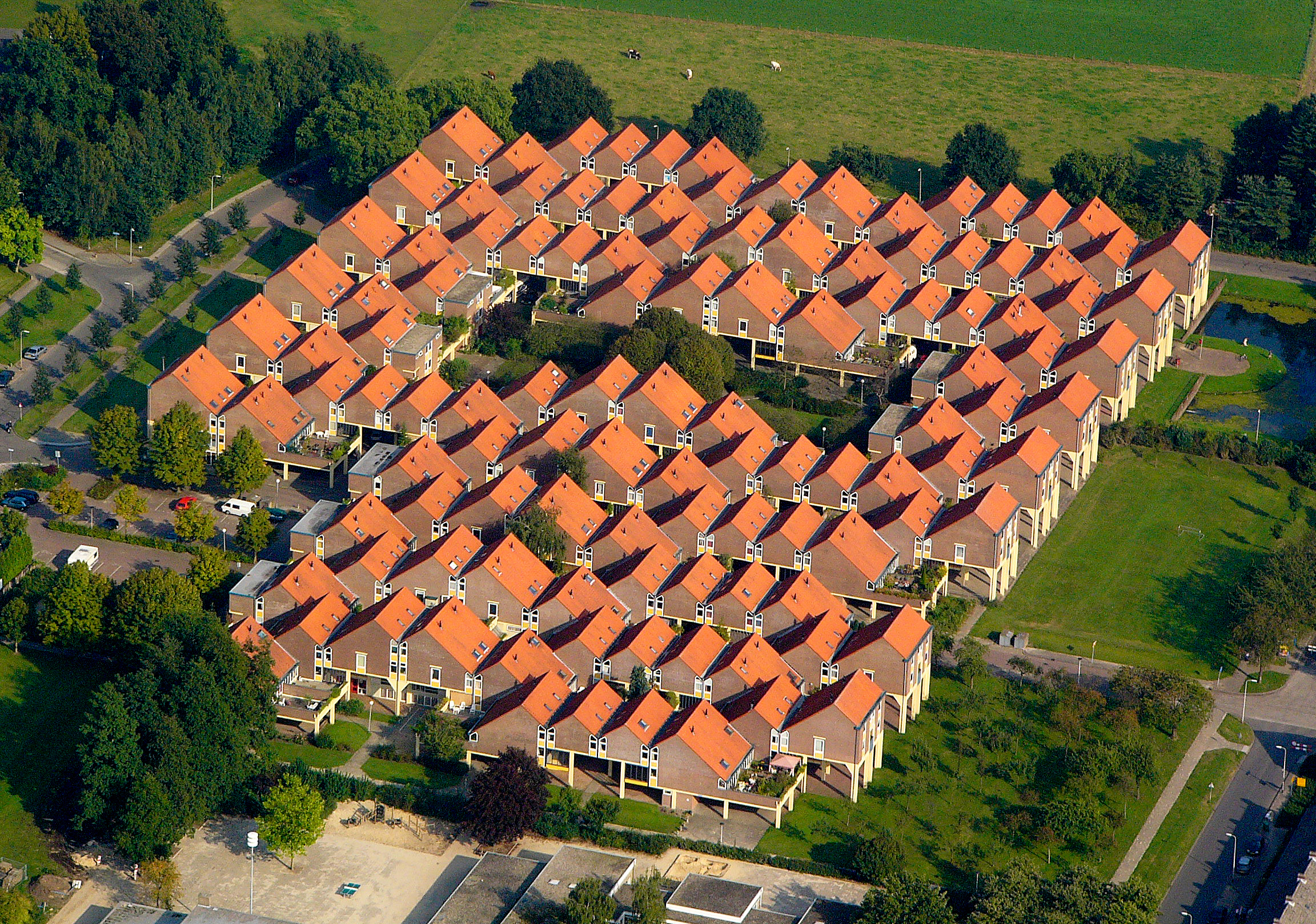
Kasbah housing estate in Hengelo, 1973 (Piet Blom)

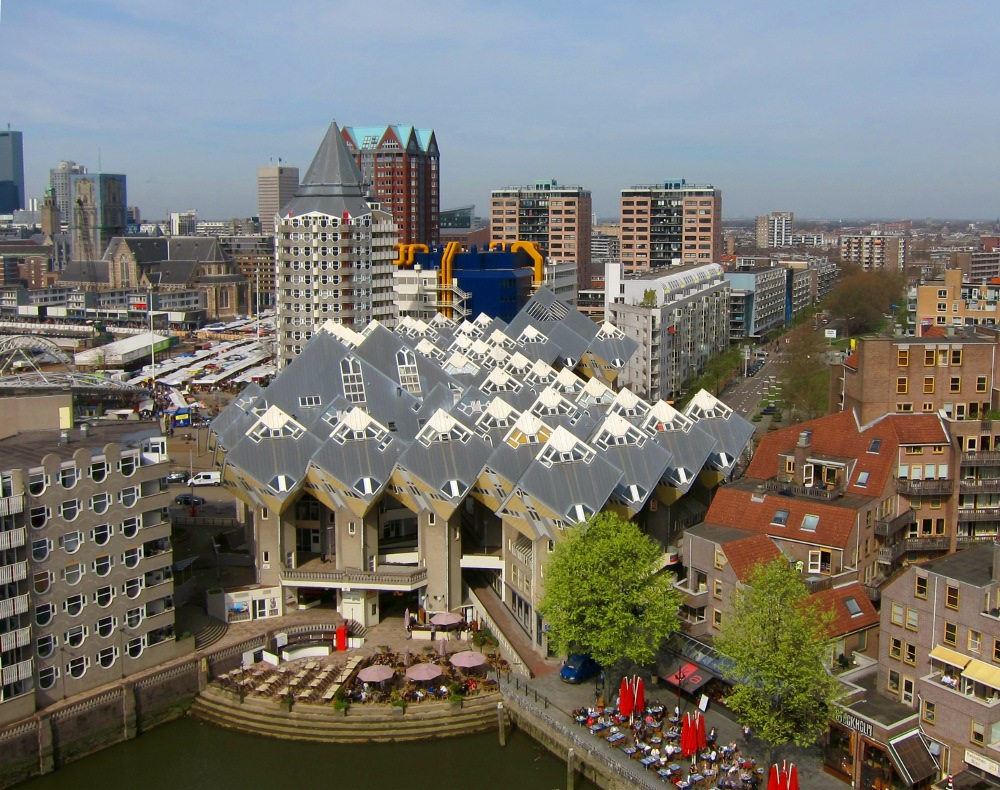
Urban district Oude Haven in Rotterdam, 1985 (Piet Blom)

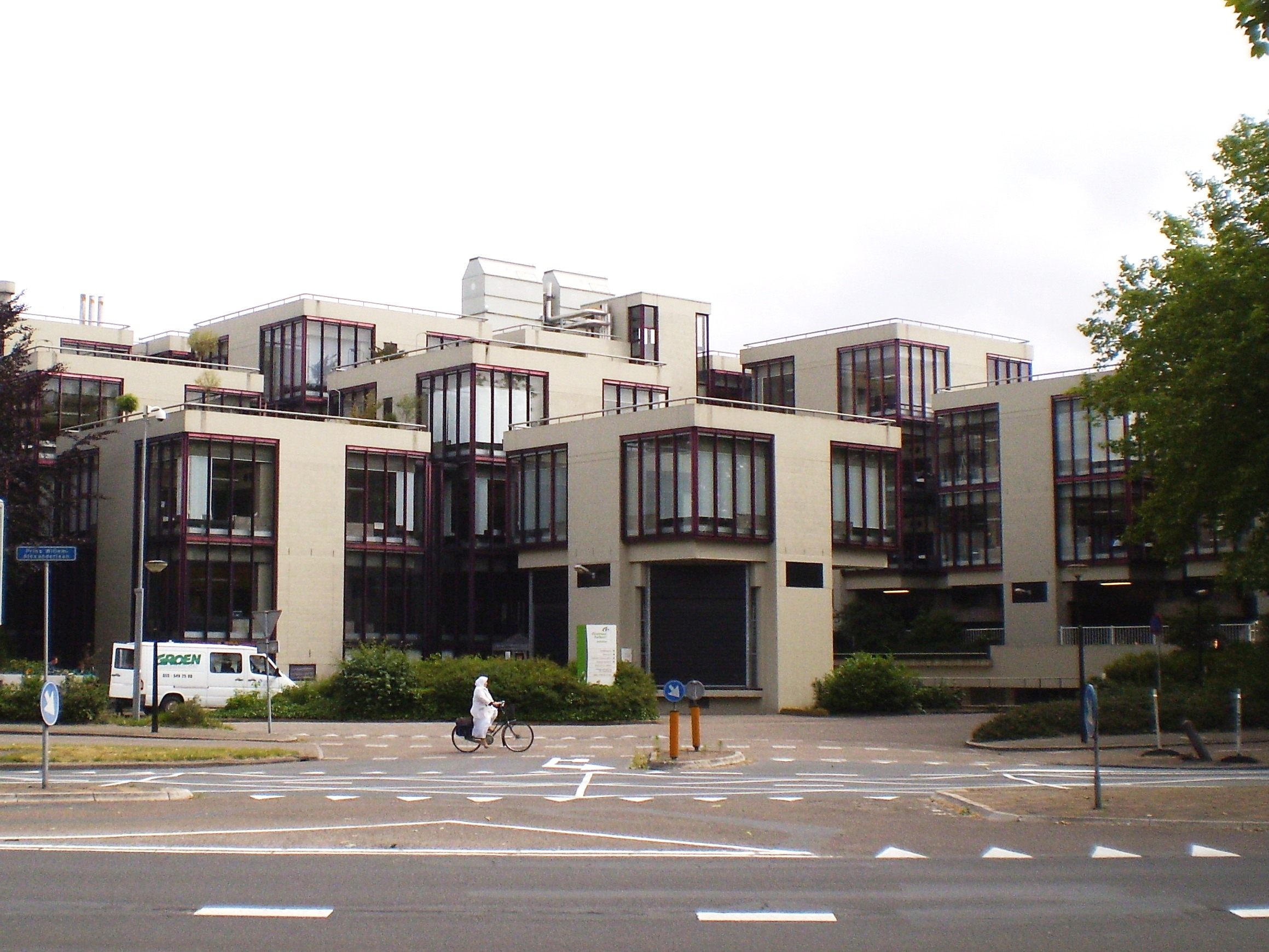
Centraal Beheer office building in Apeldoorn, 1972 (Herman Hertzberger)

Outside Team 10, other ideas developed that furthered the Structuralist movement - influenced by the concepts of Louis Kahn in the United States, Kenzo Tange in Japan and John Habraken in the Netherlands (with his theory of user participation in housing). Herman Hertzberger, Lucien Kroll and Alejandro Aravena made important architectural contributions in the field of participation.

In 1960, the Japanese architect Kenzo Tange designed his well-known Tokyo Bay Plan. Reflecting later on the initial phase of that project, he said: "It was, I believe, around 1959 or at the beginning of the sixties that I began to think about what I was later to call Structuralism." Tange also wrote the article "Function, Structure and Symbol, 1966", in which he describes the transition from a functional to a structural approach in thinking. Tange considers the period from 1920 to 1960 under the heading of "Functionalism" and the time from 1960 onwards under the heading of "Structuralism".

Le Corbusier created several early projects and built prototypes in a Structuralist mode, some of them dating back to the 1920s. Although he was criticized by the members of Team 10 in the 1950s for certain aspects of his work (urban concept without a "sense of place" and the dark interior streets of the Unité), they nevertheless acknowledged him as a great model and creative personality in architecture and art.

== Manifesto ==
One of the most influential manifestos for the Structuralist movement was compiled by Aldo van Eyck in the architectural magazine Forum 7/1959. It was drawn up as the programme for the International Congress of Architects in Otterlo (7−15 September 1959). The central aspect of this issue of Forum was a frontal attack on the Dutch representatives of CIAM-Rationalism who were responsible for the reconstruction work after World War II, (for tactical reasons, planners like van Tijen, van Eesteren, Merkelbach and others were not mentioned). The magazine contains many examples of and statements in favour of a more human form of urban planning. This congress in 1959 marks the official start of Structuralism, although earlier projects and buildings did exist. The term structuralism in architecture was published incidentally in different countries since the 1950s (see literature).

Another influential manifesto is published by John Habraken in 1961. His book Supports: An Alternative to Mass Housing is the beginning of participation in architecture, as part of the structuralist movement. This manifesto is published in the languages Dutch, English, Italian, Spanish and German.

== Otterlo Congress – participants ==
Some presentations and discussions that took place during the Otterlo Congress in 1959 are seen as the beginning of Structuralism in architecture and urbanism. These presentations had an international influence. In the book CIAM '59 in Otterlo the names of the 43 participating architects are listed.

Louis Miquel, Alger / Aldo van Eyck, Amsterdam / Josep Antoni Coderch, Barcelona / Wendell Lovett, Bellevue-Washington / Werner Rausch, Berlin / Willy Van Der Meeren, Bruxelles / Ch. Polonyi, Budapest / M. Siegler, Genf / Paul Waltenspühl, Genf / Hubert Hoffmann, Graz / Christian Farenholtz, Hamburg / Alison Smithson, London / Peter Smithson, London / Giancarlo de Carlo, Milan / Ignazio Gardella, Milan / Vico Magistretti, Milan / Ernesto Nathan Rogers, Milan / Blanche Lemco van Ginkel, Montreal / Sandy van Ginkel, Montreal / Peter Callebout, Nieuwpoort / Geir Grung, Oslo / Arne Korsmo, Oslo / Georges Candilis, Paris / Aljoša Josić, Paris / André Wogenscky, Paris / Shadrach Woods, Paris / Louis Kahn, Philadelphia / Viana de Lima, Porto / F. Tavora, Porto / Jacob B. Bakema, Rotterdam / Herman Haan, Rotterdam / J.M. Stokla, Rotterdam / John Voelcker, Staplehurst / Ralph Erskine, Stockholm / Kenzo Tange, Tokyo / Terje Moe (architect), Trondheim / Oskar Hansen, Warszawa / Zofia Hansen, Warszawa / Jerzy Sołtan, Warszawa / Fred Freyler, Wien / Eduard F. Sekler, Wien / Radovan Nikšić, Zagreb / Alfred Roth, Zurich.

== Definition of the structuralist form ==
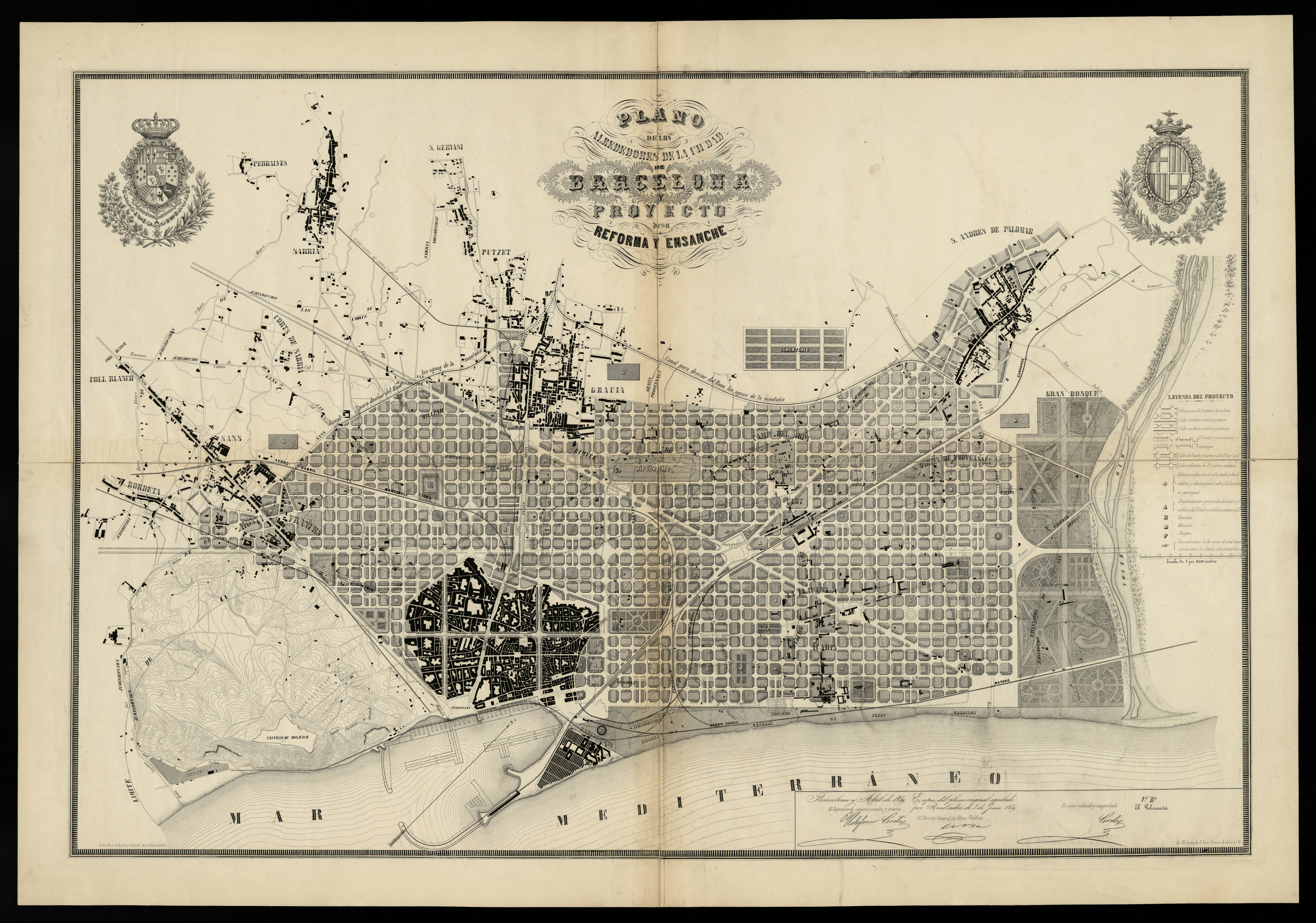
Barcelona, integration of two different structures: historic town and gridiron plan, 1859

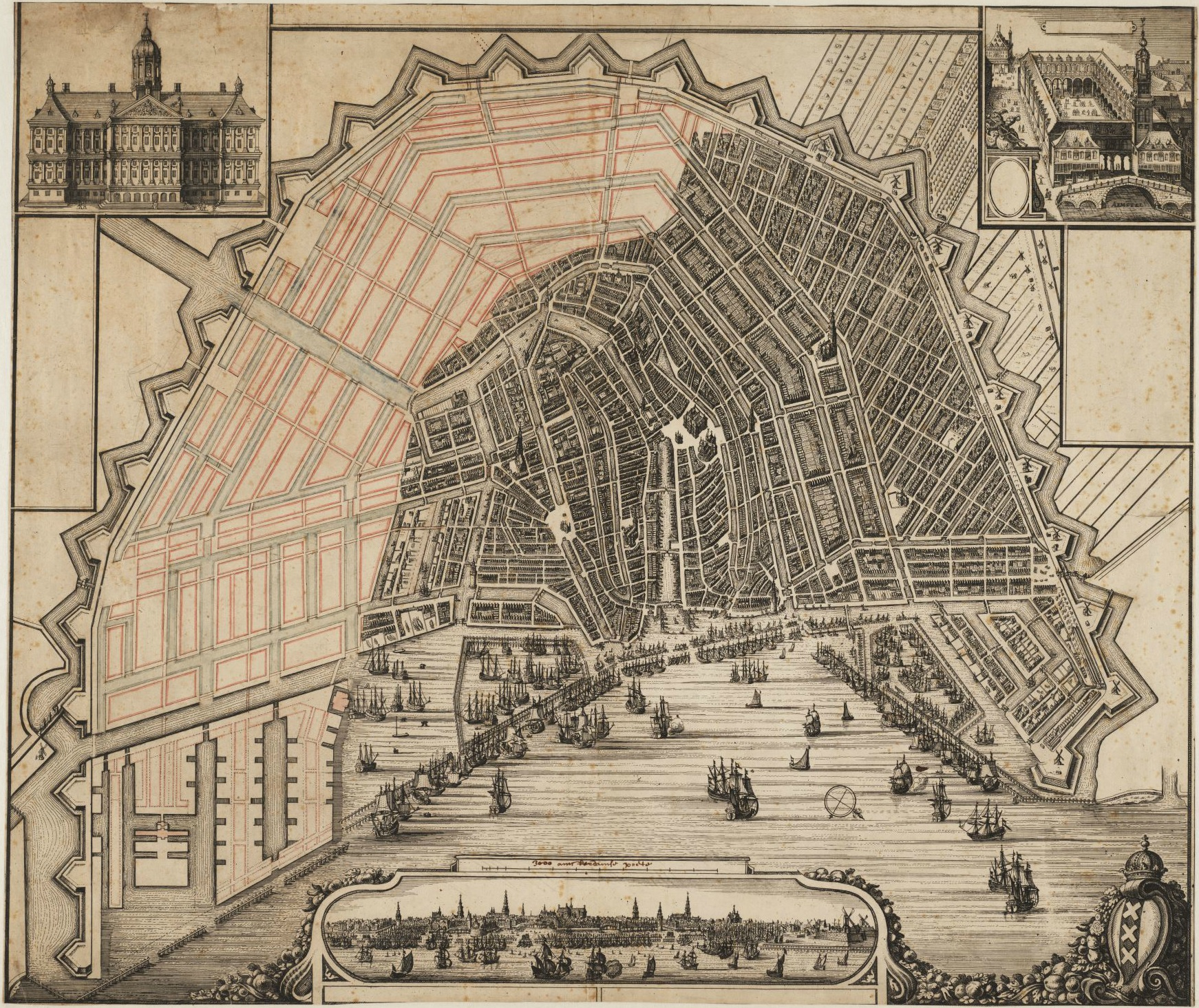
Amsterdam, structure and infill (urban ensembles), 1660

Since structuralism has different directions, there is more than one definition. The theoretical contribution by Herman Hertzberger belongs to the most interesting versions. A recent and often cited statement by Hertzberger is: "In Structuralism, one differentiates between a structure with a long life cycle and infills with shorter life cycles."

A more detailed description by Hertzberger was published in 1973. It is a structuralist definition in a general sense, but also the basis concept for user participation: "The fact that we put 'form' in a central position with respect to such notions as 'space' or 'architecture', means in itself no more than a shifting of accent. What we are talking about is in fact another notion of form than that, which premises a formal and unchanging relationship between object and viewer, and maintains this. It is not an outward form wrapped around the object that matters to us, but form in the sense of inbuilt capacity and potential vehicle of significance. Form can be filled-in with significance, but can also be deprived of it again, depending on the use that's made of it, through the values we attach to, or add to it, or which we even deprive it of, - all this dependent on the way in which the users and the form react to, and play on each other. The case we want to put is, that it is this capacity to absorb, carry and convey significance that defines what form can bring about in the users - and conversely - what the users can bring about in the form. What matters is the interaction of form and users, what they convey to each other and bring about in each other, and how they mutually take possession of each other. What we have to aim for, is, to form the material (of the things we make) in such a way that - as well as answering to the function in the narrower sense - it will be suitable for more purposes. And thus, it will be able to play as many roles as possible in the service of the various, individual users, - so that everyone will then be able to react to it for himself, interpreting it in his own way, annexing it to his familiar environment, to which it will then make a contribution." p. 56

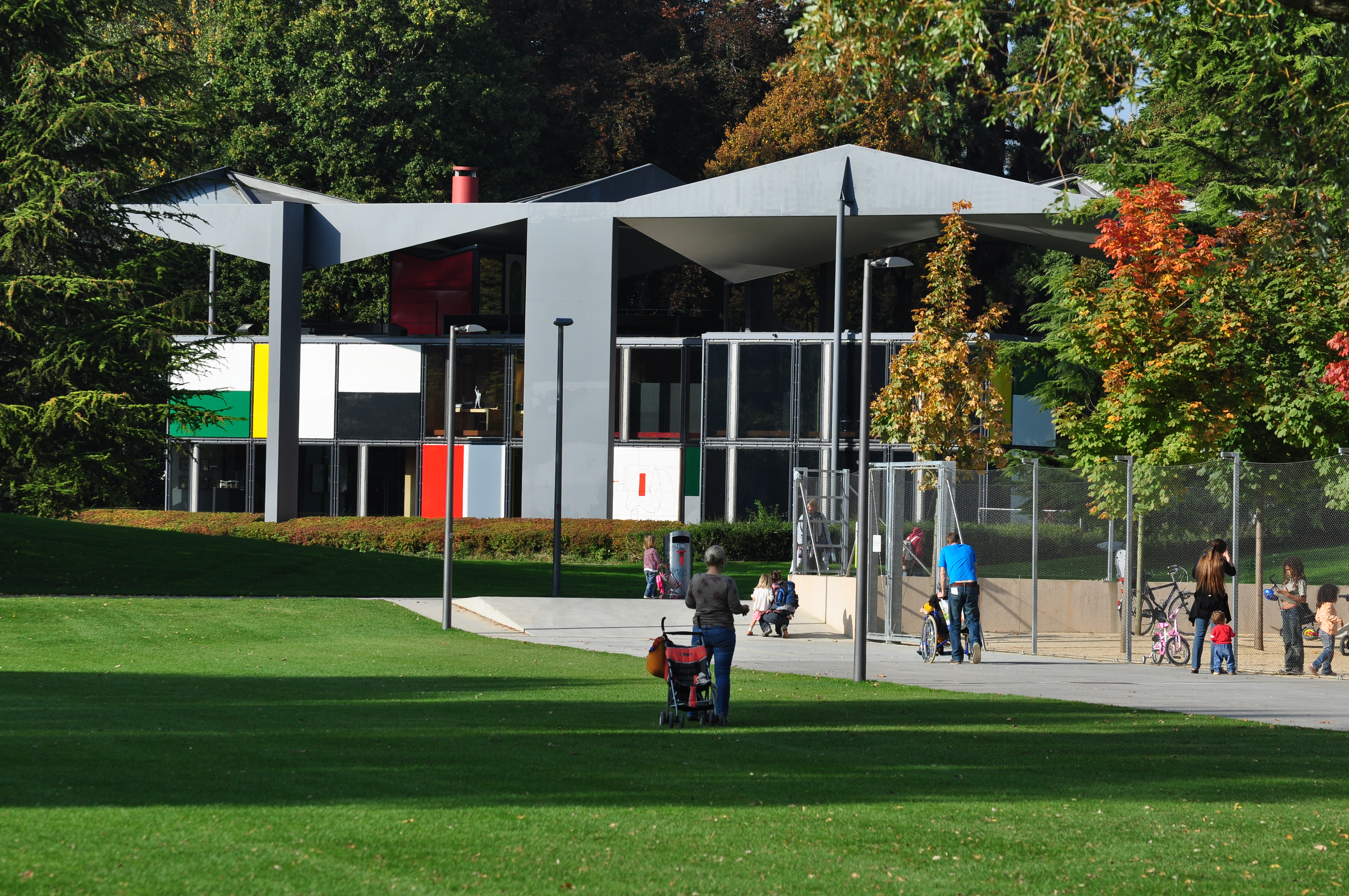
Centre Le Corbusier in Zurich, "Structure and Infill by the architect", 1963-67 (Le Corbusier)

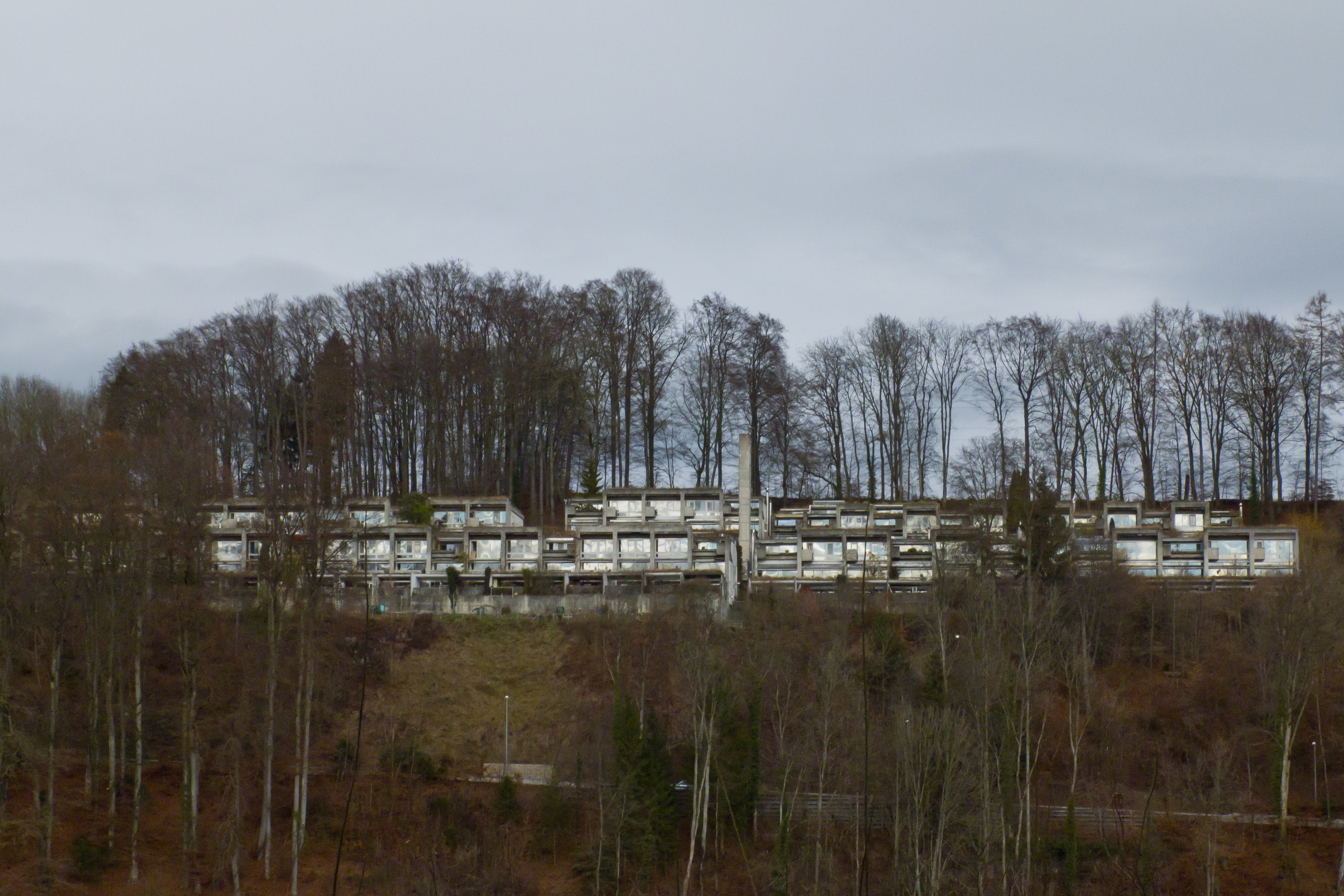
Halen housing estate near Bern, 1961 (Atelier 5)

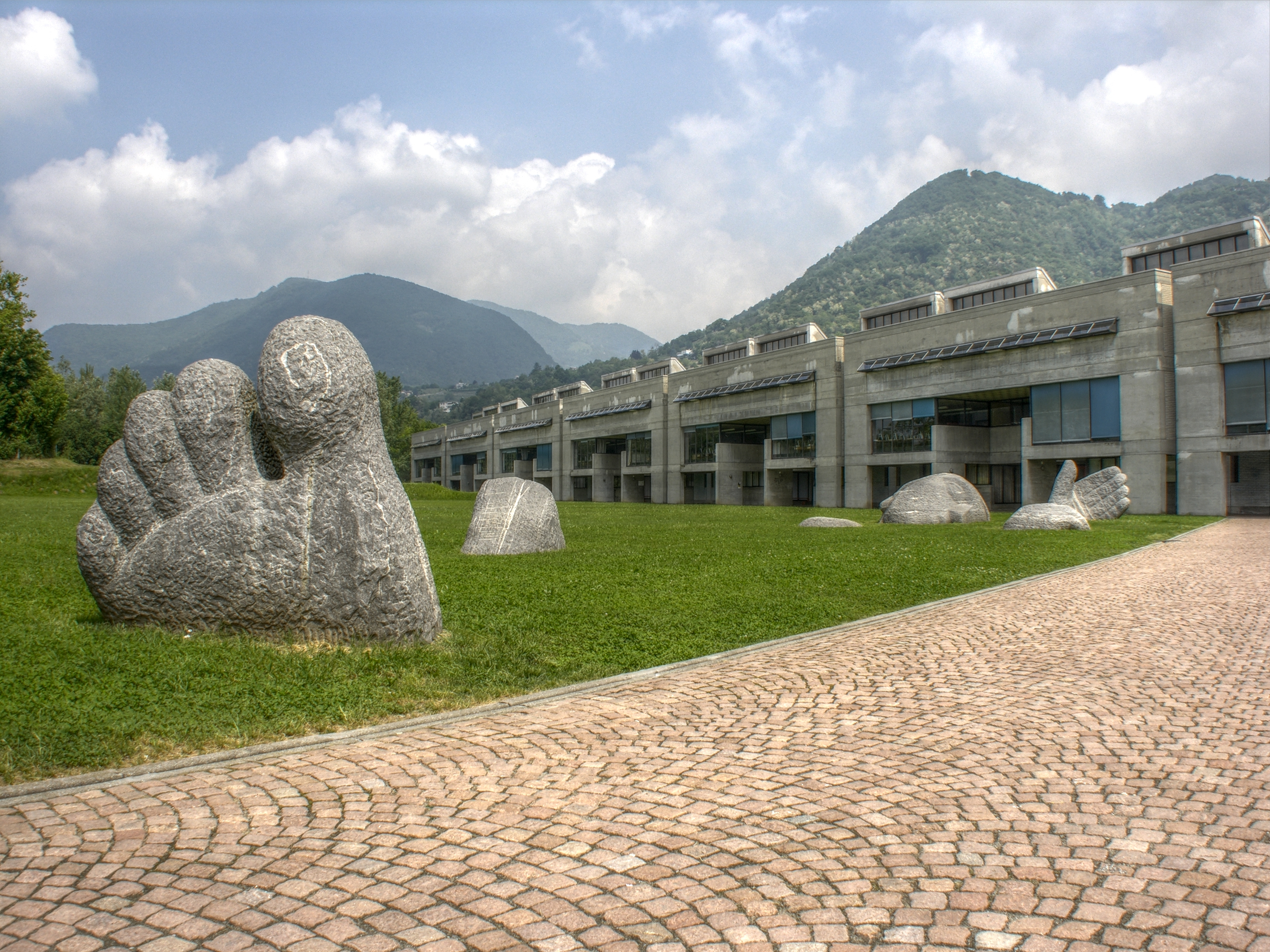
Secondary school in Morbio Inferiore, 1976 (Mario Botta)

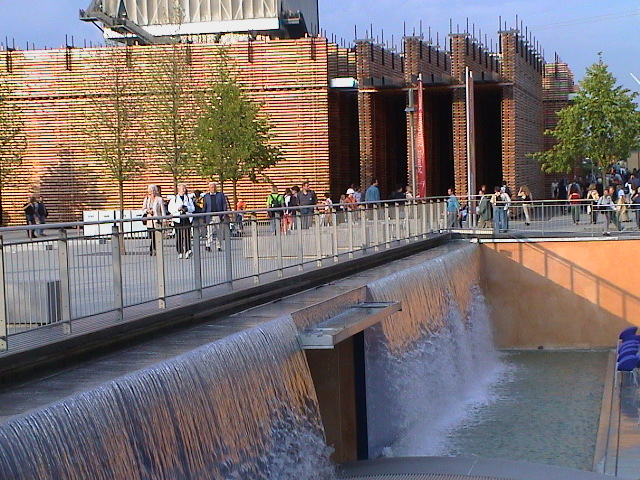
Swiss pavillon Expo 2000 in Hannover (Peter Zumthor)

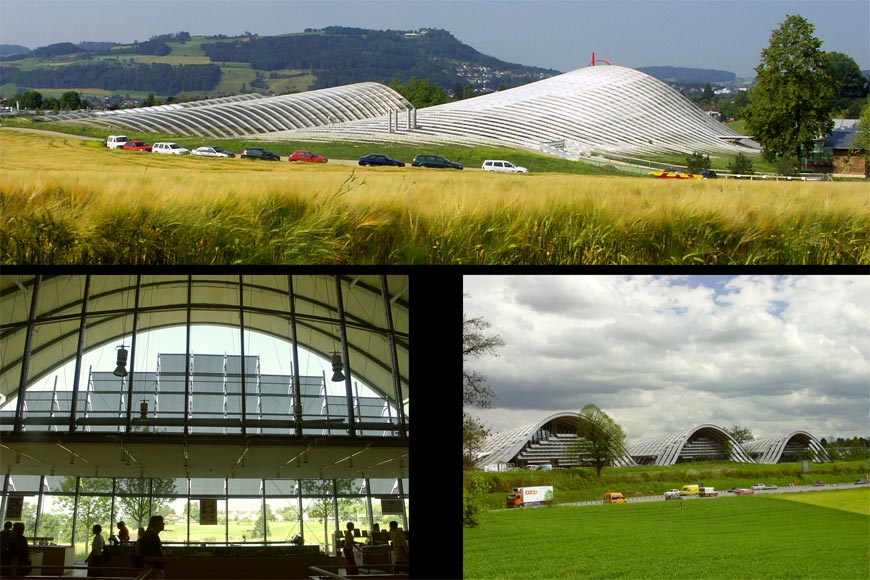
Zentrum Paul Klee, Bern 2005 (Renzo Piano)

Compared to other directions of structuralism in architecture, the following clarifications are noted: "In the new architectural movement there is often a tendency to call everything Structuralist that resembles a woven texture and has a grid. This would be a superficial way of looking at things. By nature Structuralism is concerned with the configuration of conditioned and polyvalent units of form (spatial, communicational, constructional or other units) at all urban scales. Only when the users have taken possession of the structures through contact, interpretation or filling-in the details, do the structures achieve their full status. Any architecture that has a tendency to formalism is thus excluded. Flexible form, which has been much discussed, is also rejected as a neutral enclosing system, since it does not offer the appropriate solution for any spatial programme. In the architecture of Herman Hertzberger Structuralist form can be found from the smallest detail up to the most complicated structure, whether it is in terms of spatial, facade or environmental design." p. 5

The next quotation is a definition of structuralism in different fields. It also discusses the autonomy of the primary structure: "Many Structuralists would describe a structure roughly in the following terms: it is a complete set of relationships, in which the elements can change, but in such a way that these remain dependent on the whole and retain their meaning. The whole is independent of its relationship to the elements. The relationships between the elements are more important than the elements themselves. The elements are interchangeable, but not the relationships." p. 16

== Theoretical origins, principles and aspects ==
- Built structures corresponding in form to social structures, according to Team 10 (Working group for the investigation of interrelationships between social and built structures).
- The archetypical behaviour of man as the origin of architecture (cf. Anthropology, Claude Lévi-Strauss). Different Rationalist architects had contacts with groups of the Russian Avant-Garde after World War I. They believed in the idea that man and society could be manipulated.
- Coherence, growth and change on all levels of the urban structure. The concept of a Sense of place. Tokens of identification (identifying devices). Urban Structuring and Articulation (of the built volume).
- Polyvalent form and individual interpretations (compare the concept of langue et parole by Ferdinand de Saussure). User Participation in housing. Integration of "high" and "low" culture in architecture (fine architecture and everyday forms of building). Pluralistic architecture.

The principle Structure and Infill remains relevant until now, both for housing schemes and urban planning. For housing schemes the following images were influential: the perspective drawing of the project "Fort l'Empereur" in Algiers by Le Corbusier (1934), the isometric drawing of the housing scheme "Diagoon" in Delft by Herman Hertzberger (1971) and the realized social housing projects by Alejandro Aravena in the 21st century. At city level, important projects were: the Tokyo Bay Plan of Kenzo Tange (1960) and the fascinating images of the model of the Free University of Berlin by Candilis Josic & Woods (1963). Also, worth mentioning are the utopias of Metabolism, Archigram and Yona Friedman. In general, instruments for urban structuring are: traffic lines (e.g. gridiron plans), symmetries, squares, remarkable buildings, rivers, seashore, green areas, hills etc. These methods were also used in previous cities.

The principle Aesthetics of Number proved to be less useful for structuring an entire city. However, exemplary articulated configurations did arise, both in architecture and housing schemes. The first influential images for this direction Aldo van Eyck provided with aerial photos of his orphanage in Amsterdam (1960). Later he built another inspiring configuration for the Space Centre Estec in Noordwijk (1989). These two compositions can be counted among the most beautiful "icons" of structuralism.

== Housing estates, buildings and projects ==
- OMA, office Rem Koolhaas: Housing project Homeruskwartier in Almere, 2012 (participation)
- Richard Rogers: Madrid-Barajas Airport terminal 4, 2006
- Renzo Piano: Zentrum Paul Klee, Museum in Bern, 2005
- Alejandro Aravena: Social housing projects in Iquique 2004, Santiago 2007, Monterrey 2010, Constitución 2016 (participation)
- Riegler Riewe: Fakultät für Informations- und Elektrotechnik der Technischen Universität Graz, 2000
- Adriaan Geuze et al.: New urban district Borneo-Sporenburg Scheepstimmermanstraat in Amsterdam, 1997 (participation)
- Rafael Moneo: National Museum of Roman Art, Mérida, 1986
- Renzo Piano & Richard Rogers: Centre Georges-Pompidou in Paris, 1977
- Lucien Kroll: Students' Centre St. Lambrechts-Woluwe in Louvain-la-Neuve near Brussels, 1976 (participation)
- Verhoeven Klunder Witstok & Brinkman: Housing estate in Berkel-Rodenrijs near Rotterdam, 1973
- Piet Blom: Kasbah housing estate in Hengelo, 1973 / Urban district Oude Haven in Rotterdam, 1985
- Craig Zeidler & Strong: McMaster University Medical Centre in Hamilton Canada, 1972

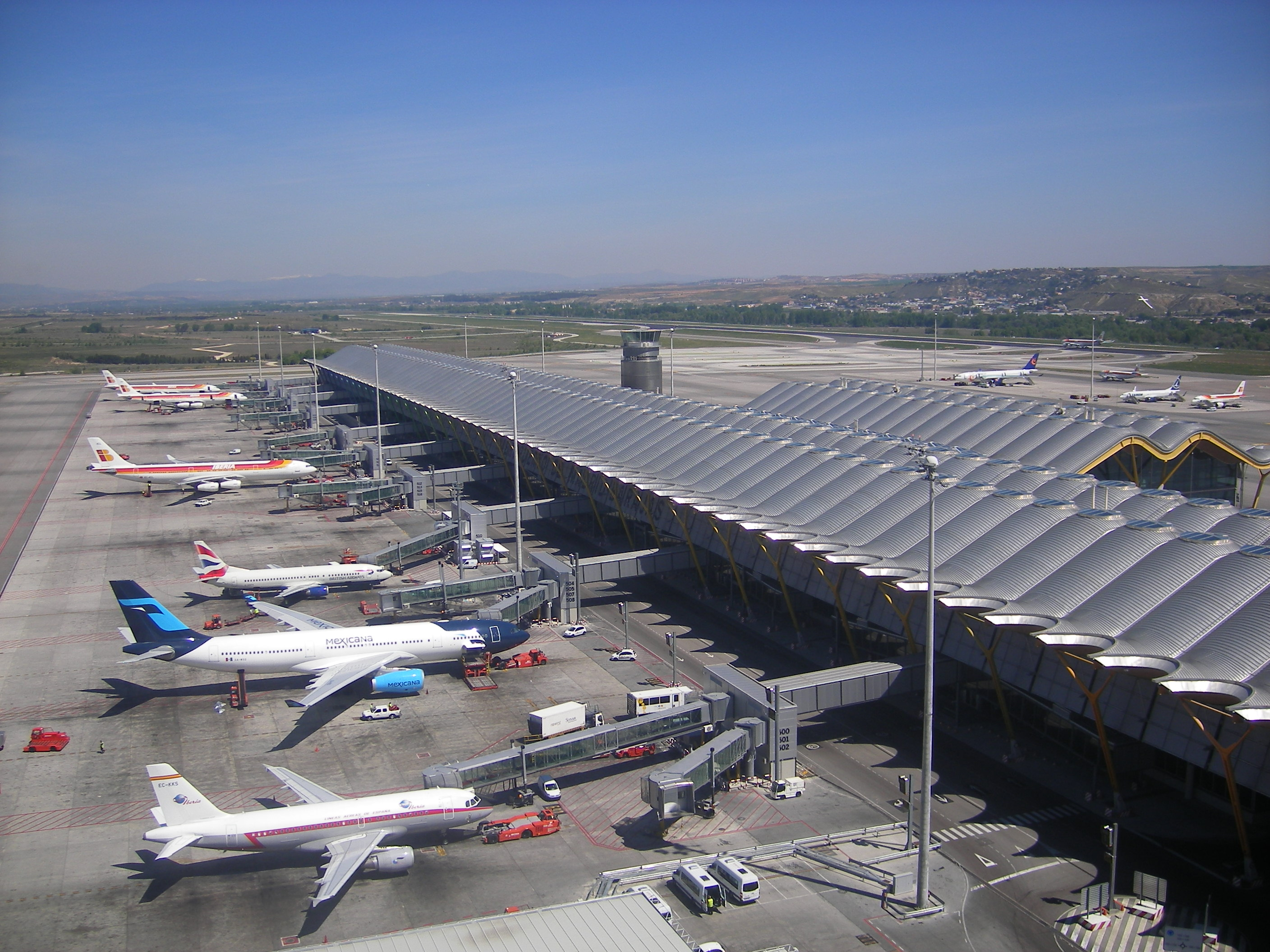
Madrid-Barajas Airport, 2006 (Richard Rogers)

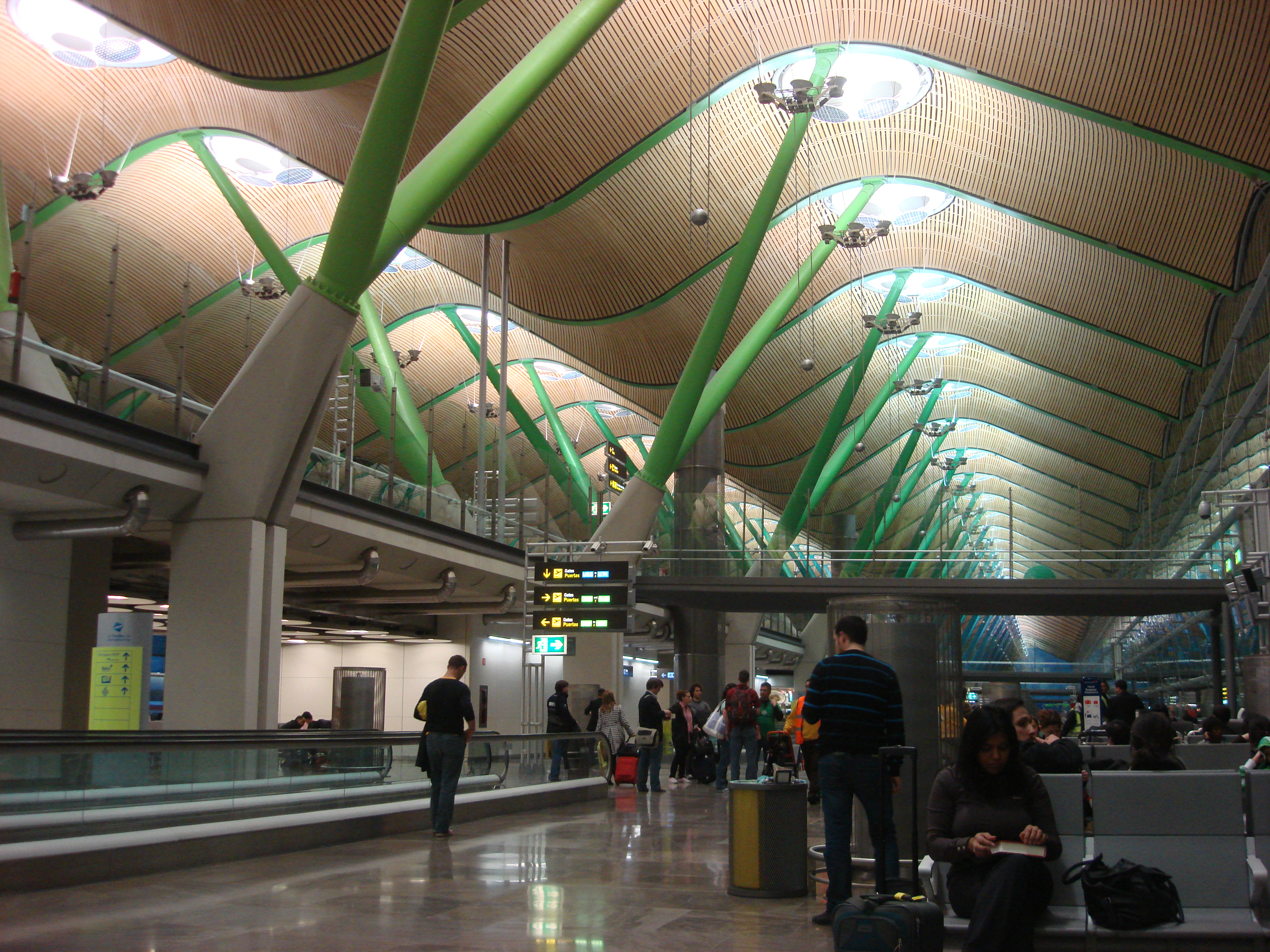
Madrid-Barajas Airport, terminal 4

- Kisho Kurokawa: Nakagin Capsule Tower in Tokyo, 1972
- Herman Hertzberger: Centraal Beheer office building in Apeldoorn, 1972 (participation, inside) / Diagoon, eight experimental houses in Delft, 1971 (participation)
- Moshe Safdie: Habitat '67 housing estate, World Exposition in Montréal, 1967 / The Children's Monument Yad Vashem in Jerusalem, 2005
- Giancarlo De Carlo: Student housing Collegio del Colle Urbino, 1966
- Stefan Wewerka: New city district Ruhwald in Berlin, project 1965
- Candilis Josic & Woods: Free University of Berlin, 1963–73
- Atelier 5: Halen housing estate near Bern, 1961
- Kenzo Tange: Tokyo Bay Plan, project 1960 / Yamanashi Culture Chamber in Kofu, 1967
- Aldo van Eyck: Orphanage in Amsterdam, 1960 / European Space Research and Technology Centre Estec, restaurant conference-hall library in Noordwijk, 1989
- Louis Kahn: Jewish Community Center in Trenton, project 1954 / Salk Institute in La Jolla California, 1965 / Kimbell Art Museum in Fort Worth, 1972
- Alison and Peter Smithson: Golden Lane housing estate in London, project 1952 / Urban-planning scheme 1953: Hierarchy of Association "house-street-district-city"
- Van den Broek & Bakema, Stokla: New Rotterdam districts: Pendrecht project 1949 / Alexanderpolder projects 1953 and 1956
- Le Corbusier: Perspective drawing of new city district Fort l'Empereur in Algiers, project 1934 (participation) / Weekend house near Paris, 1935 / Centre Le Corbusier in Zurich, 1967

== Units of structure - a characteristic of structuralist architecture and urbanism ==
A remarkable characteristic of the architectural movement is the 'structuring of the built volume with units and grid', in different variations. In the book Structuralism in Architecture and Urban Planning this design principle is published under the following titles:

1. Structures formed of building units
2. Structures formed of building groups
3. Structures formed of structural units
4. Structures formed of communication units (vertical units, horizontal units)
5. Other structures (without grid)
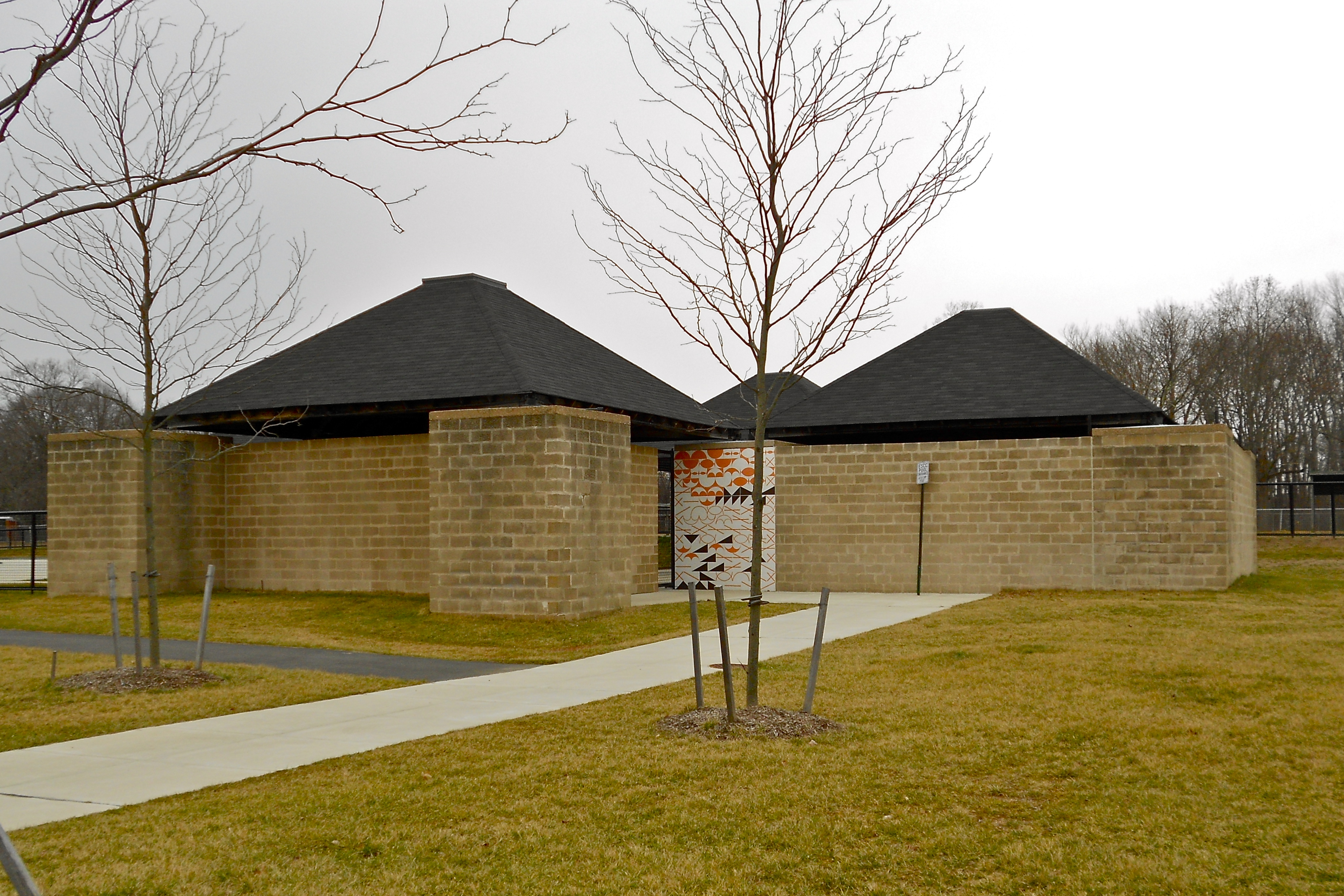
* 1. – Trenton Bath House, in Ewing Township NJ, part of a larger plan, 1955 (Louis Kahn)

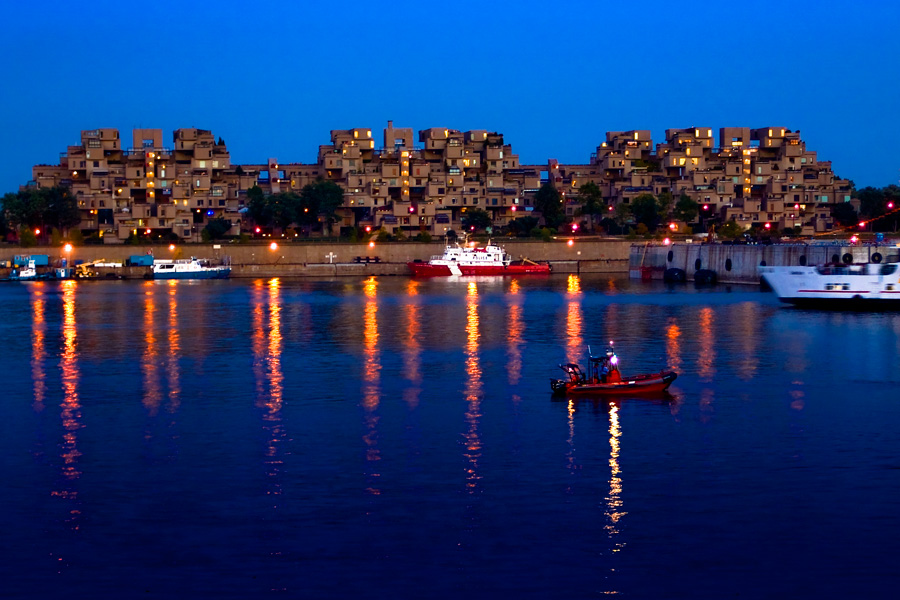
* 2. – Habitat 67 in Montreal, 1967 (Moshe Safdie)

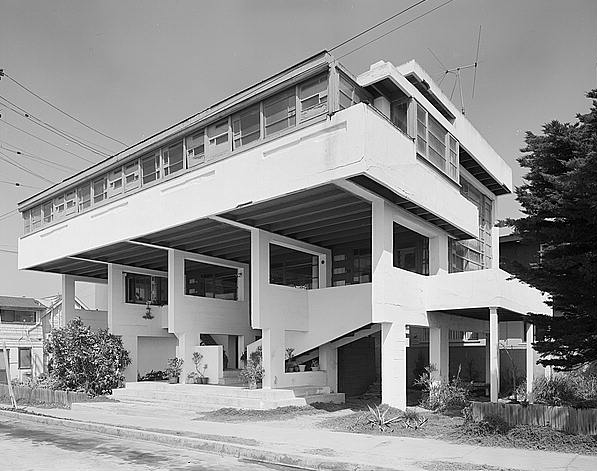
* 3. – Lovell Beach House in Newport Beach, 1926 (Rudolph Schindler)

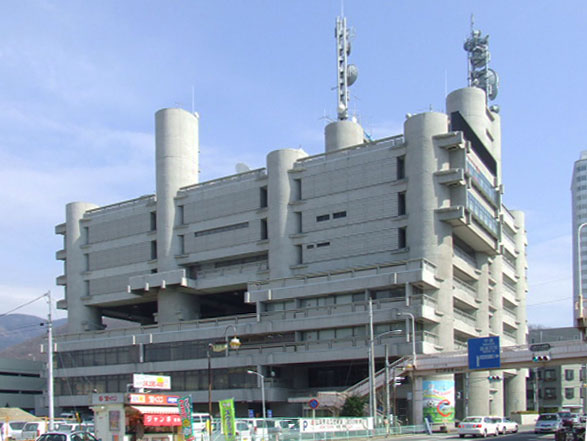
* 4a. – Yamanashi Culture Chamber in Kofu, 1967 (Kenzo Tange)

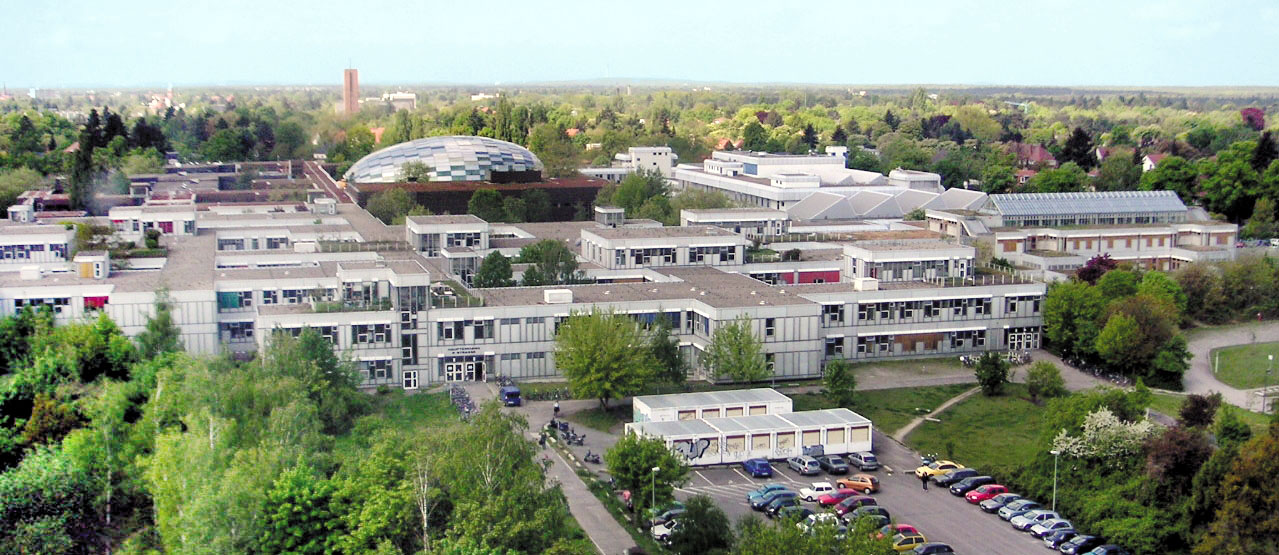
* 4b. – FU Berlin 1963-1973 (Candilis Josic Woods)

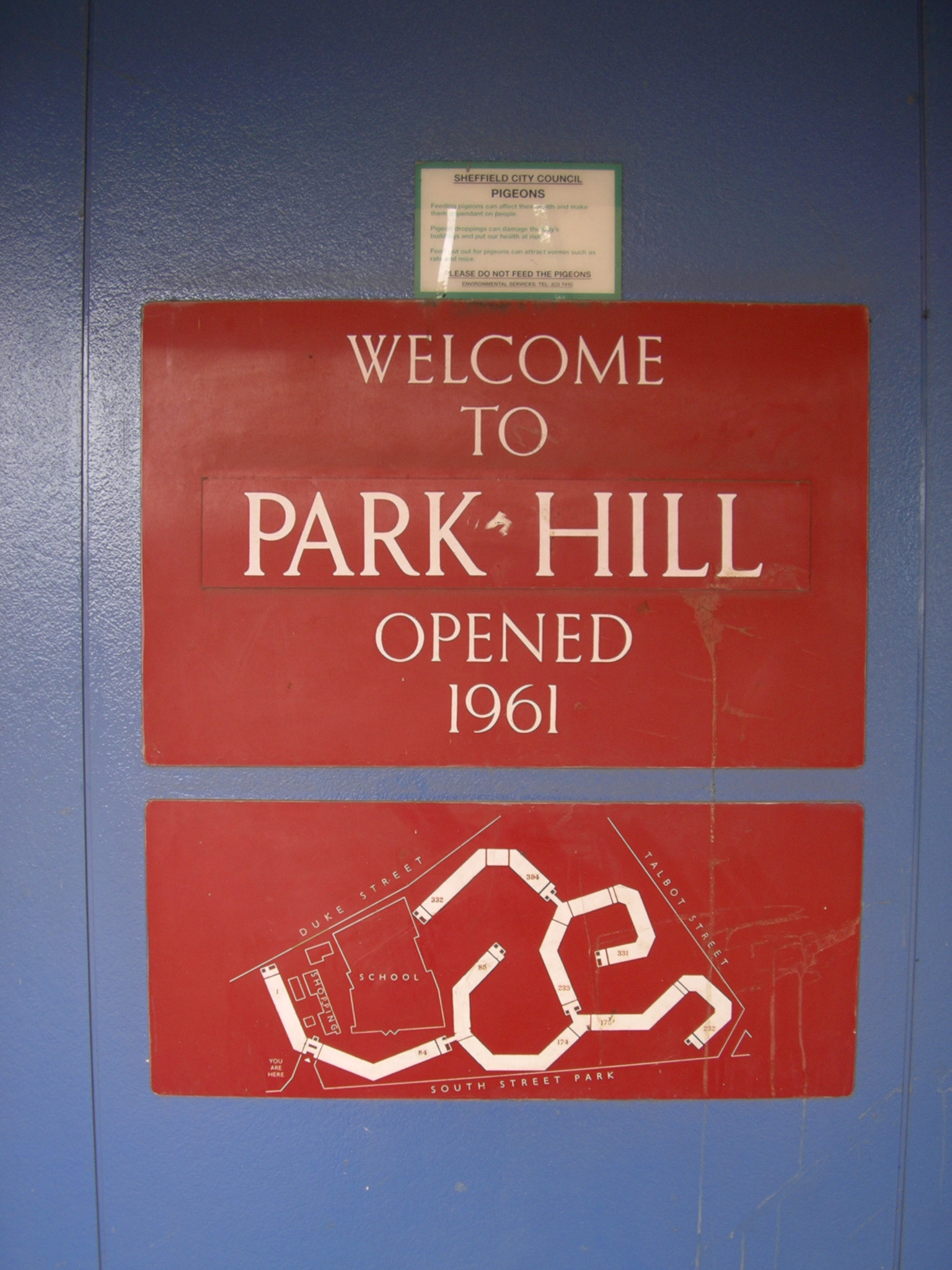
* 5. – Park Hill in Sheffield, 1961 (Jack Lynn and Ivor Smith, under J. L. Womersley)

== Different types of structures ==
=== Aesthetics of number ===
The term "aesthetics of number" is introduced by Aldo van Eyck in the architectural magazine Forum 7/1959. In his article van Eyck showed two works of art: a structuralist painting by the contemporary artist Richard Paul Lohse and a Kuba textile (Bakuba tissue) by an African artist of the "primitive" culture. The combination of these two cultures has a symbolic meaning in the structuralist movement. The outward appearance of this architecture is unchangeable.

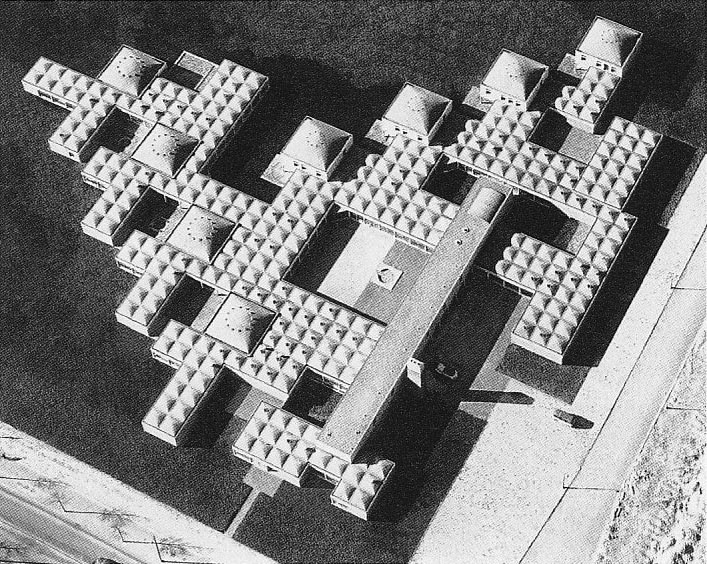
Municipal Orphanage in Amsterdam, "Aesthetics of Number", 1960 (Aldo van Eyck)

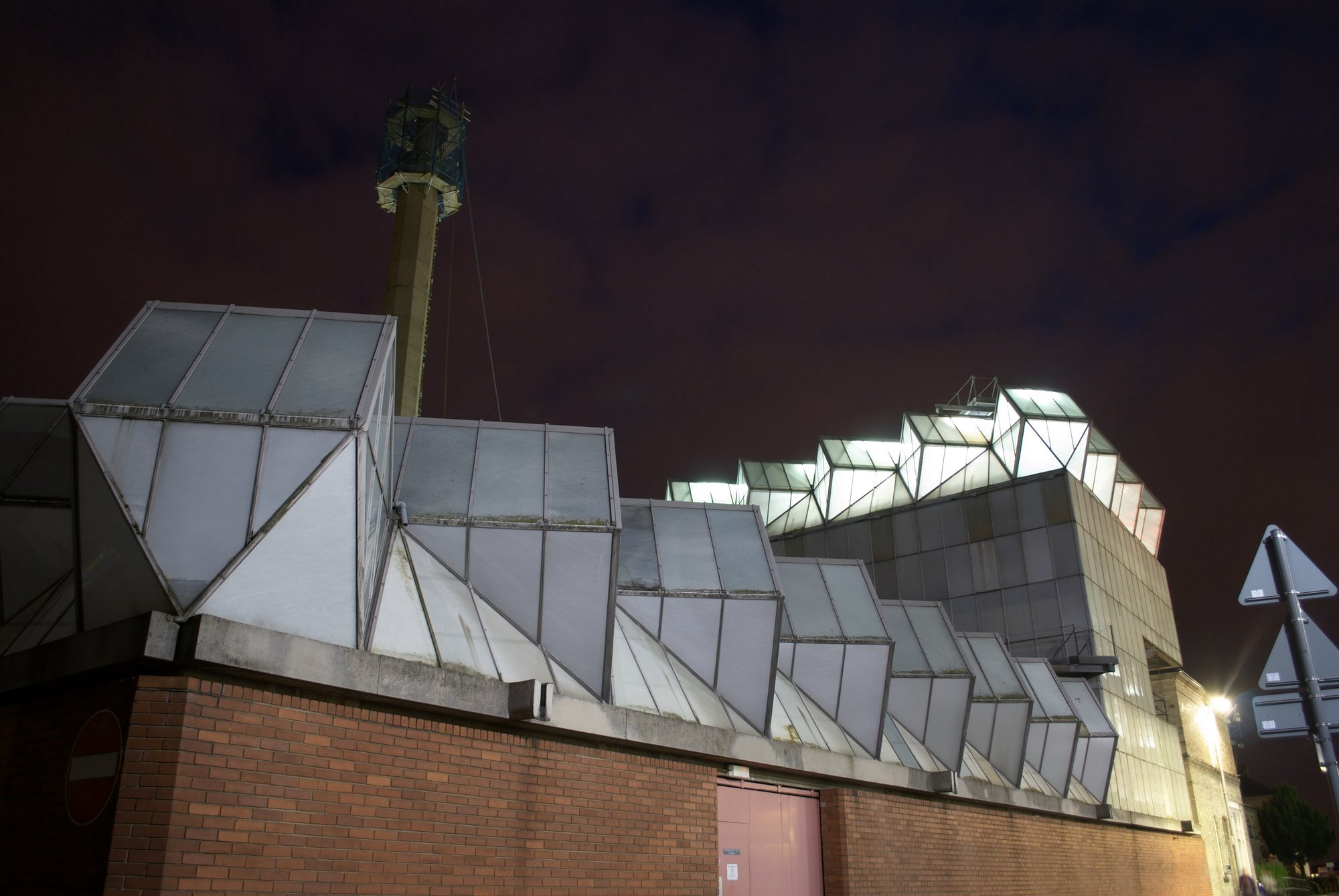
University of Leicester Engineering Building, 1959–1963 (Stirling-Gowan)

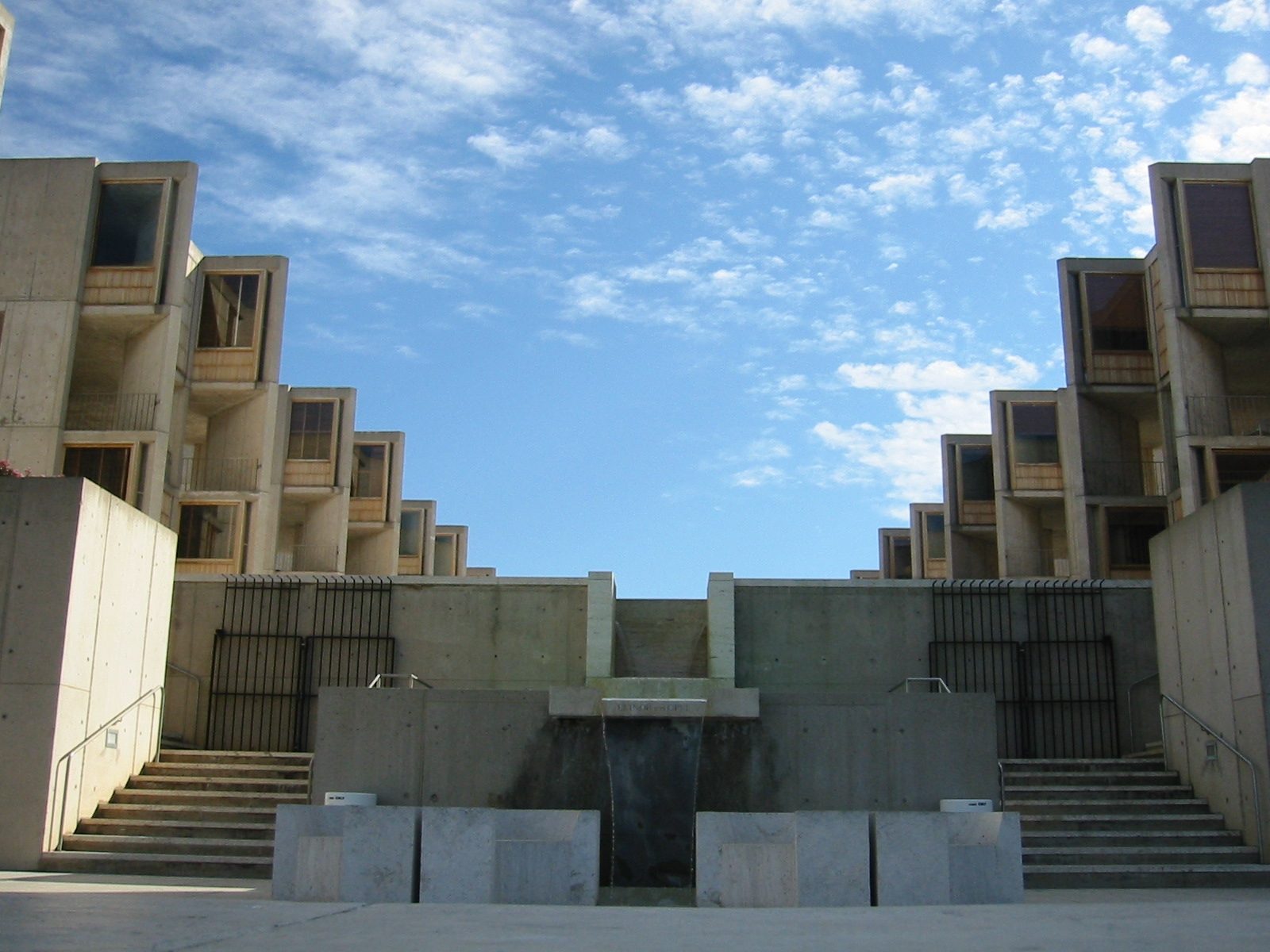
Salk Institute in La Jolla California, 1965 (Louis Kahn)

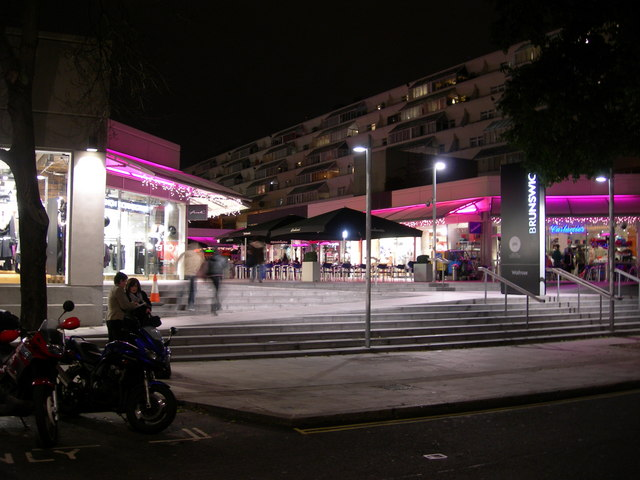
Brunswick Centre Bloomsbury London, 1972 (Patrick Hodgkinson)

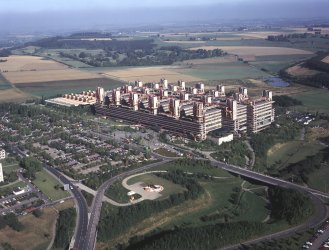
Klinikum Aachen, 1971–1985

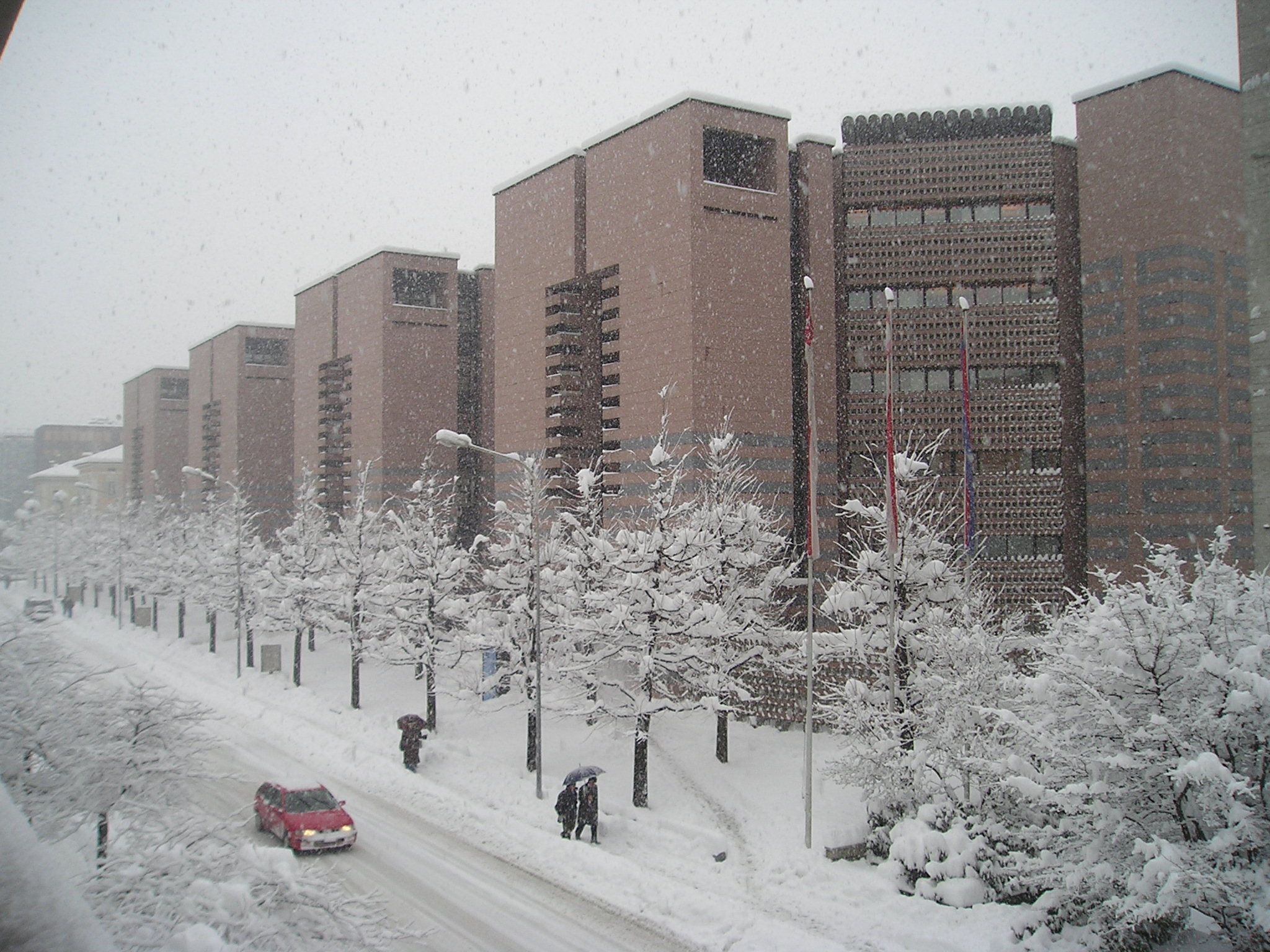
Office building Banca del Gottardo in Lugano, 1987 (Mario Botta)

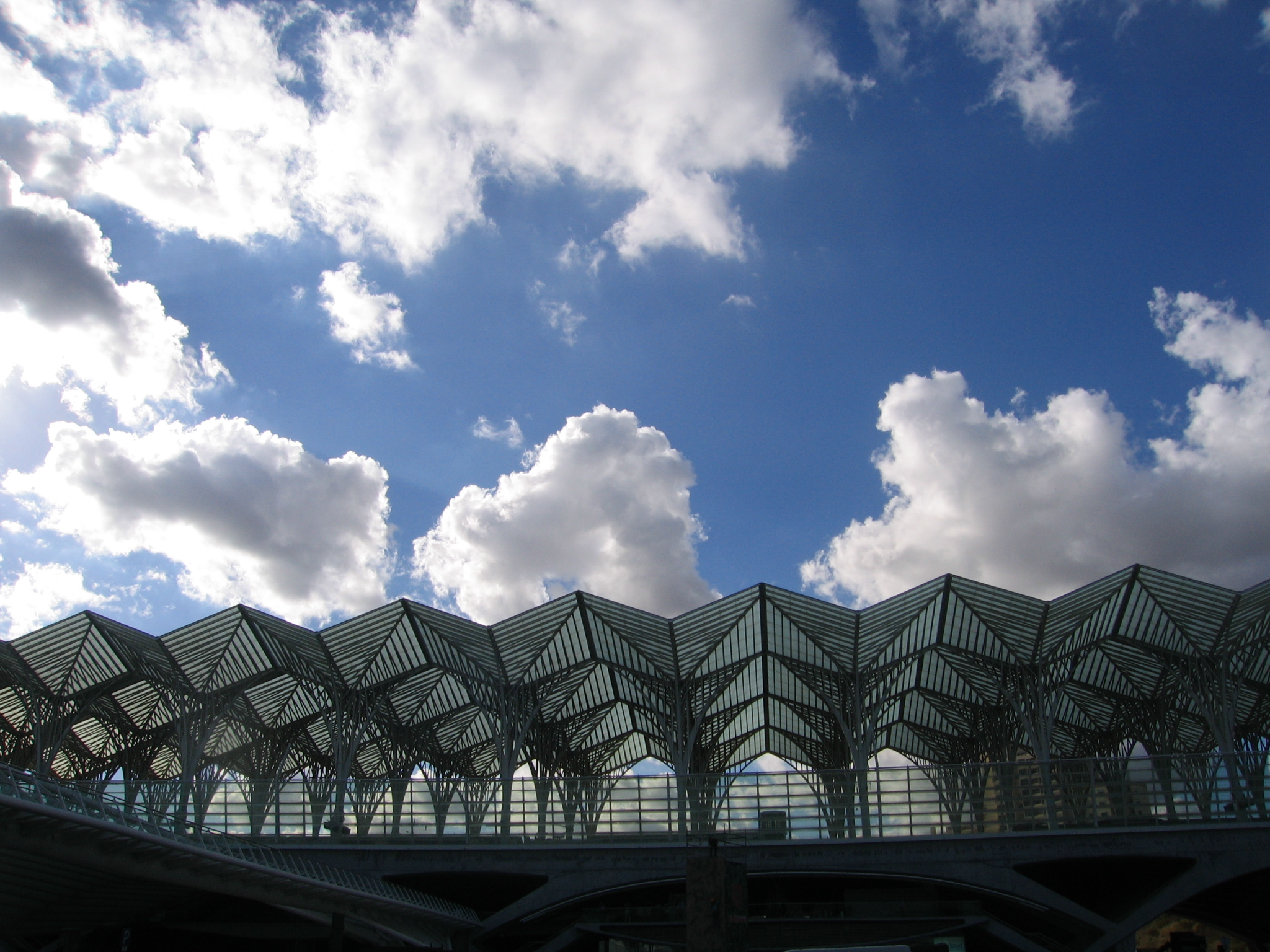
Gare do Oriente, Station in Lisbon, 1998 (Santiago Calatrava)

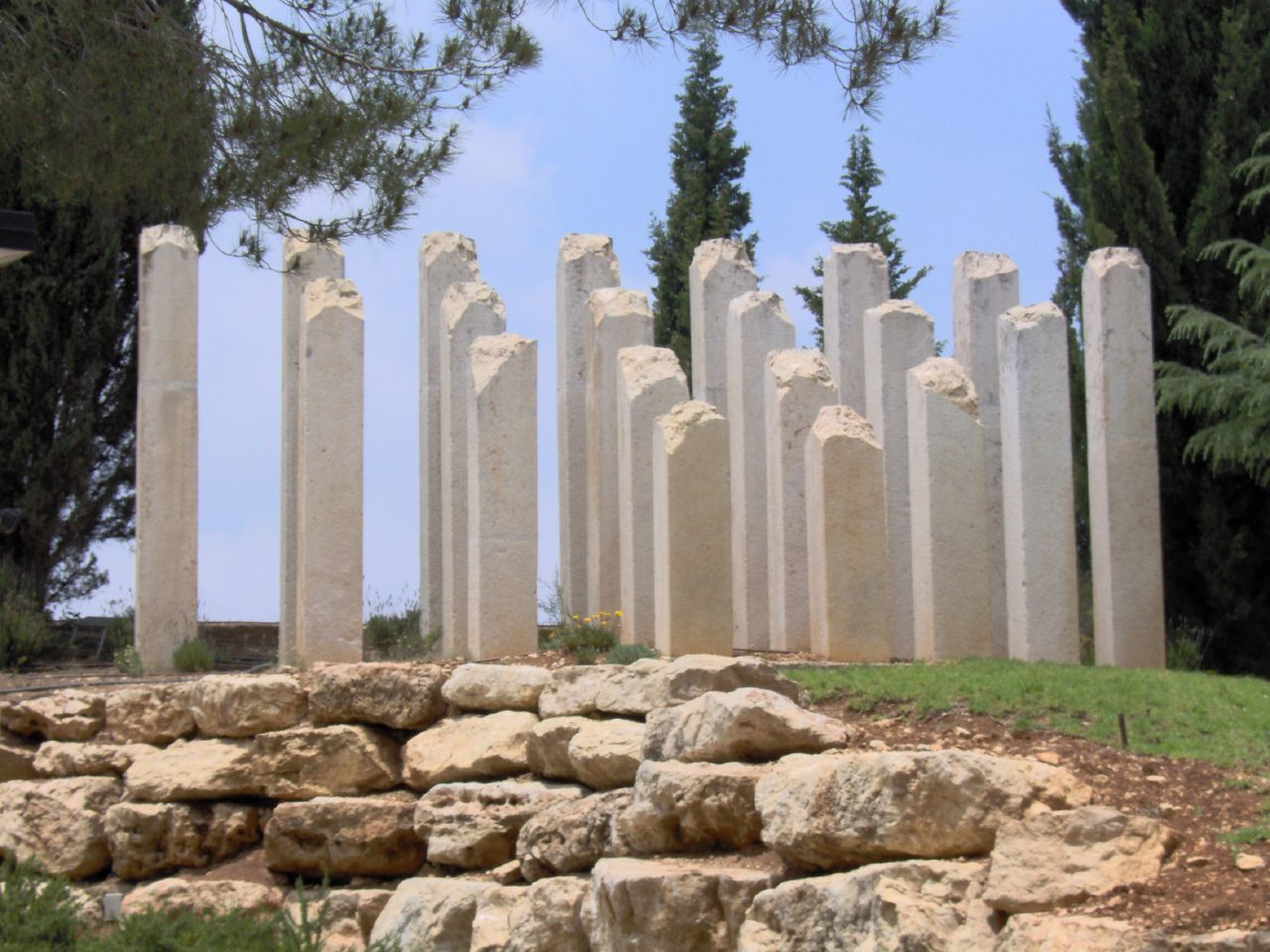
The Children's Monument Yad Vashem Jerusalem, 2005 (Moshe Safdie)

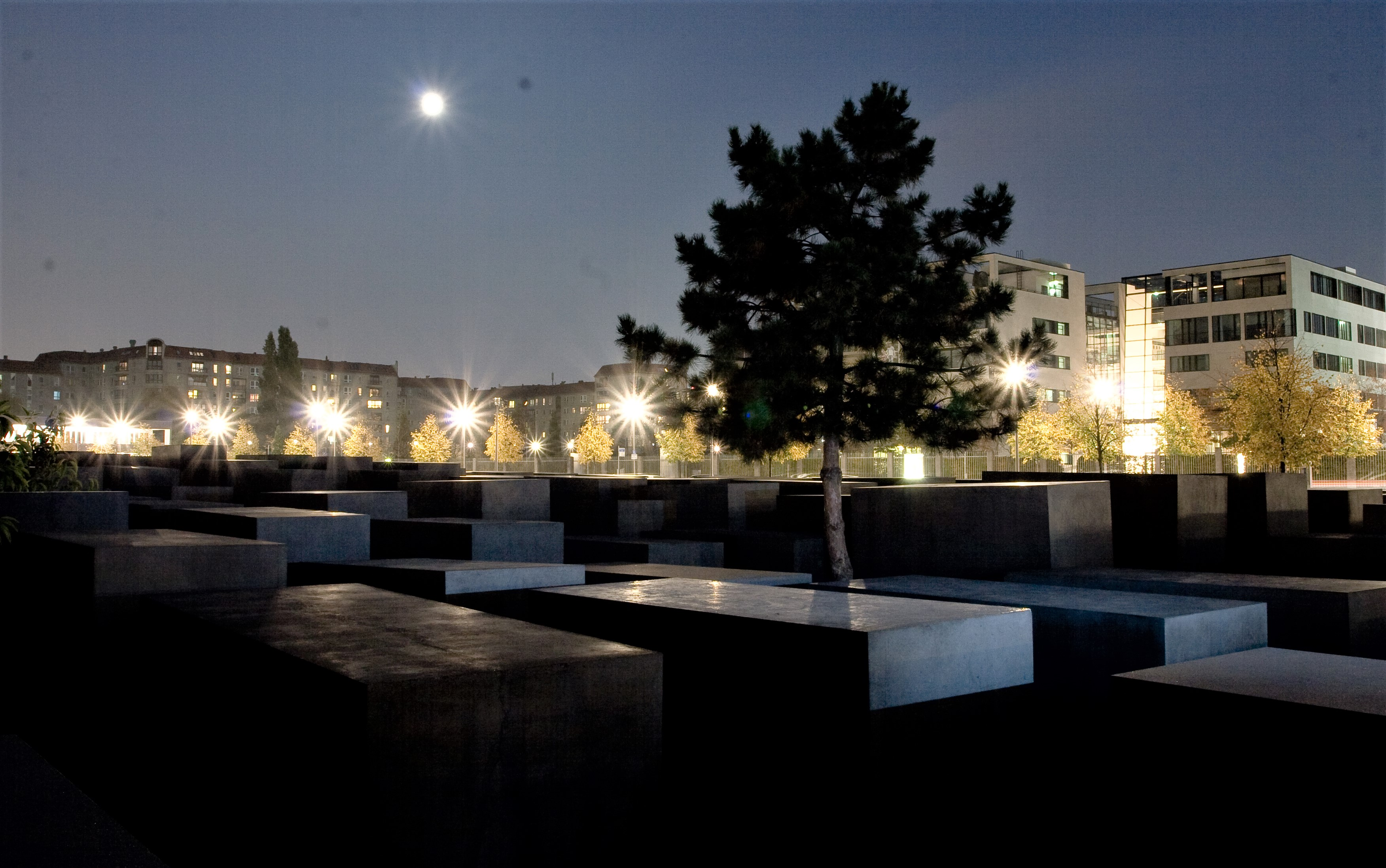
Memorial in Berlin, 2005 (Peter Eisenman)

=== Structure and infill – two-components approach – participation ===
In the 1960s the Dutch structuralists criticised the narrowness of the functional principle "Form Follows Function". In historic cities they found solutions for a more relevant form principle: an interpretable, adaptable and expandable architecture (see below "Historic cities - Reciprocity of form"). In the magazine Forum they developed ideas about "Polyvalent form and individual interpretations", "Reciprocity of form", "Structure and infill" and "Participation". Herman Hertzberger also used the terms "Architecture as half-product" and "Open structures".

The initiator of participation in architecture, as part of the structuralist movement, was John Habraken. In 1961 he published the book Supports: An Alternative to Mass Housing in different languages. In the 21st century architect Alejandro Aravena from Chile is working with similar principles of participation. In relation to his social housing projects Aravena is talking about "Participatory design process", "Half-houses for participation" and "Incremental housing". Although Aravena was awarded the Pritzker-Prize in 2016 for his architectural work, there are no photos on Wikipedia of his housing projects. In place of the missing photos, there are photos of the cities in this article. Illustrations of his housing projects can be found on Google (Maps and Images) with the added addresses. In 2008, for the Triennale in Milan Alejandro Aravena built a prototype of a "Half-house" in a similar way as the Pavillon de l'Esprit Nouveau in Paris by Le Corbusier in 1925.

Structure and infill – vertical and horizontal communication units

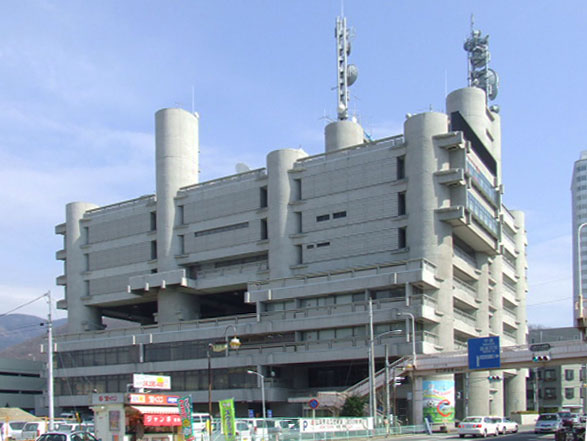
"Interpretable, adaptable and expandable" – Yamanashi in Kofu, 1967 (Kenzo Tange)

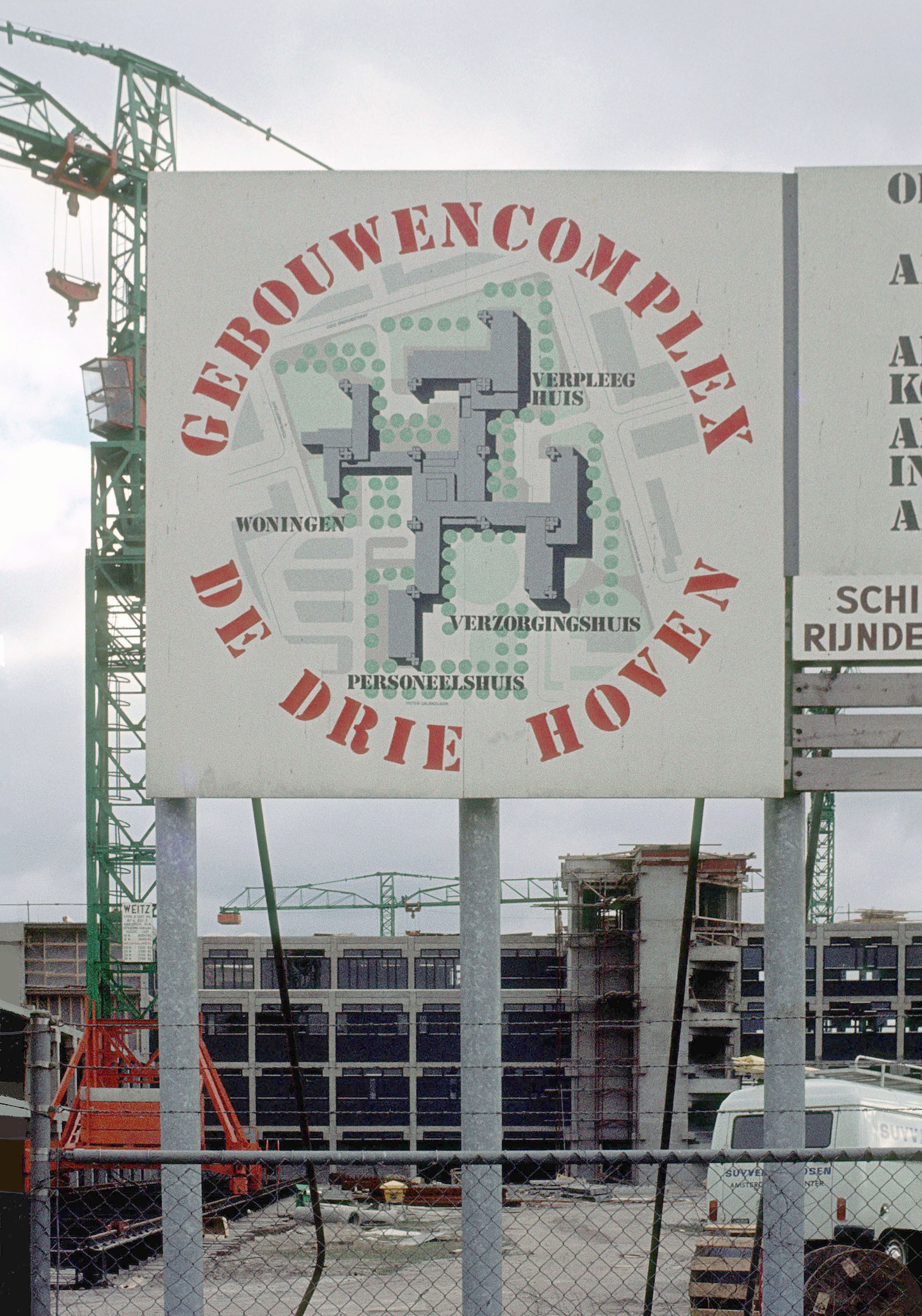
De Drie Hoven for elderly people in Amsterdam, 1974 (Herman Hertzberger)

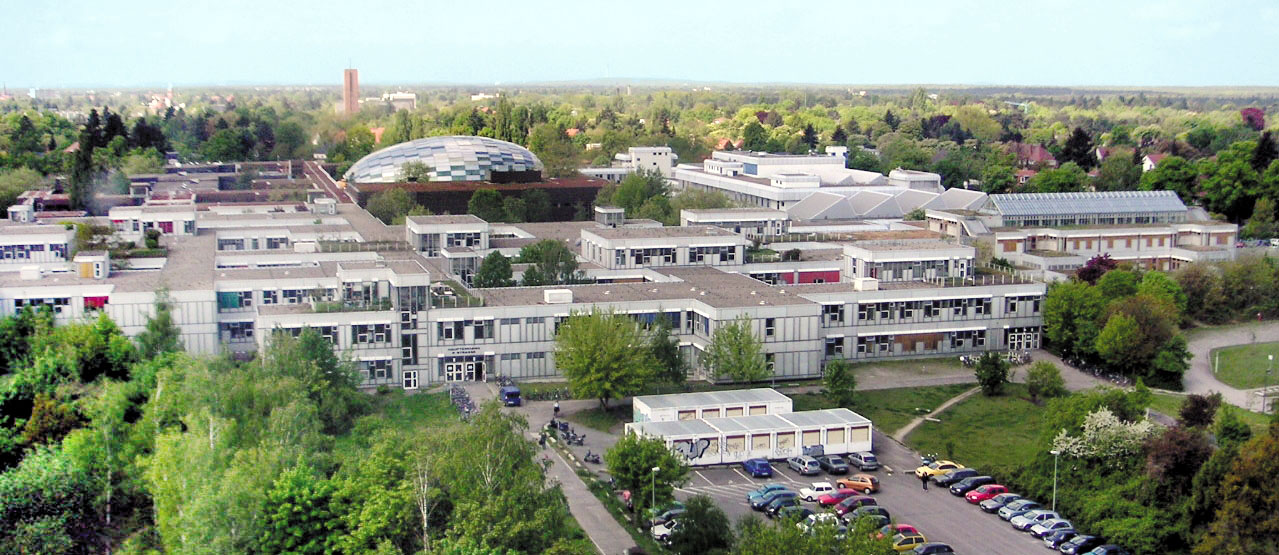
Free University of Berlin, 1963-1973 (Candilis Josic Woods)

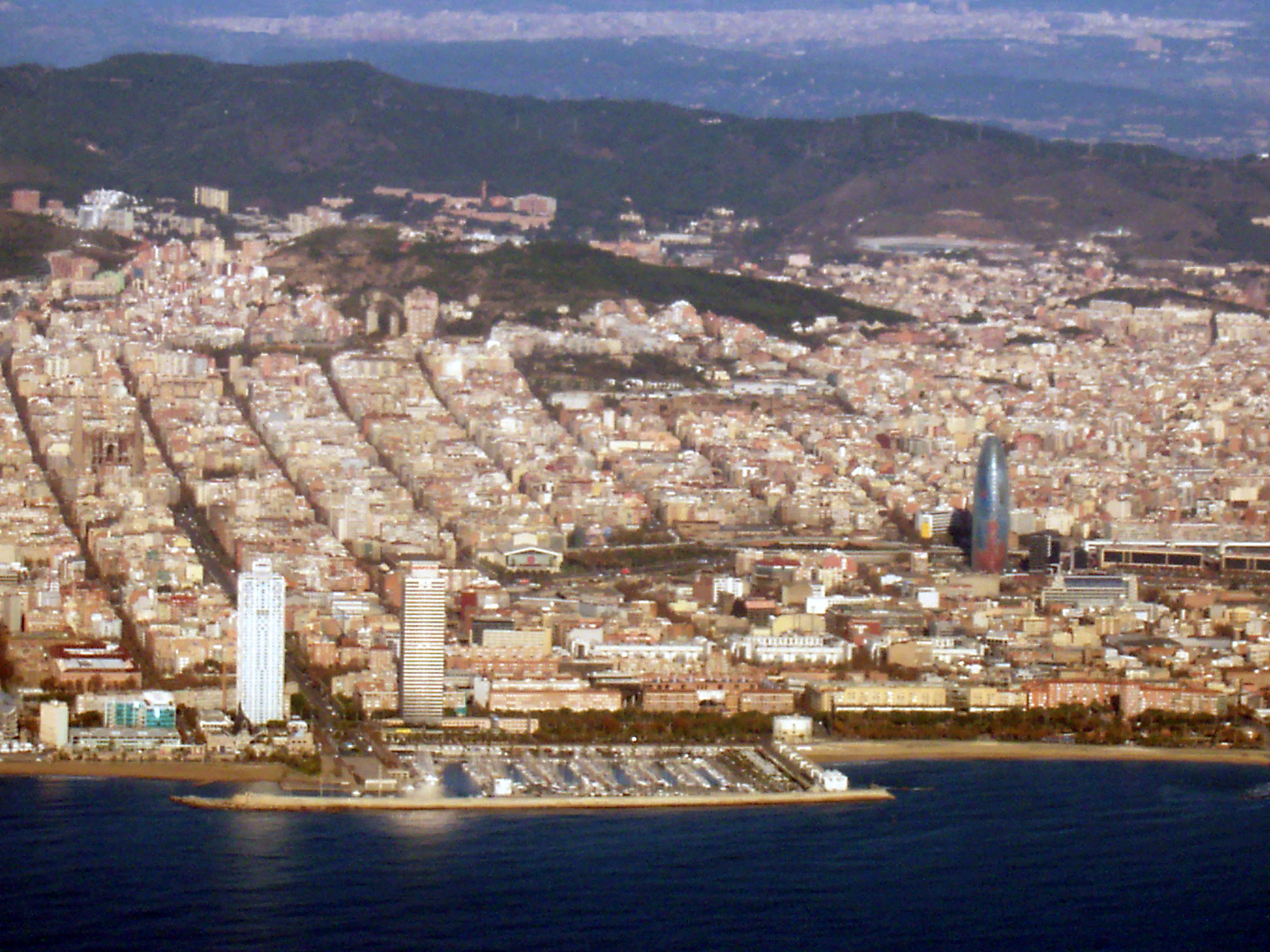
Barcelona, urban plan 19th century

Participation in housing

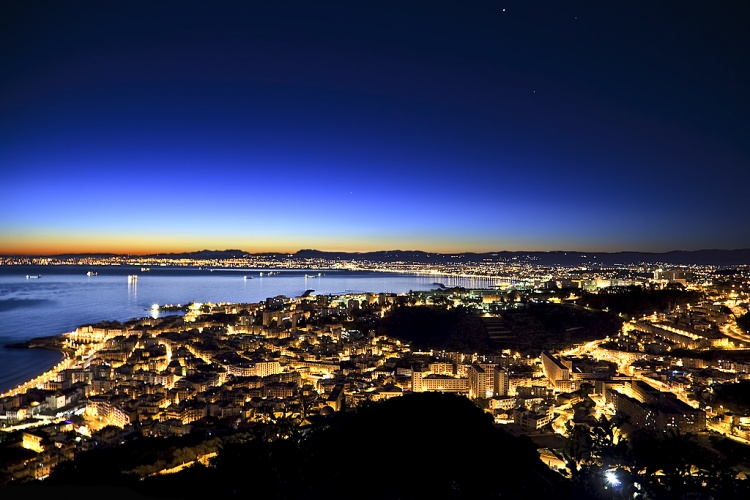
In 1934 Le Corbusier designed the project Fort l'Empereur in Algiers, for resident participation

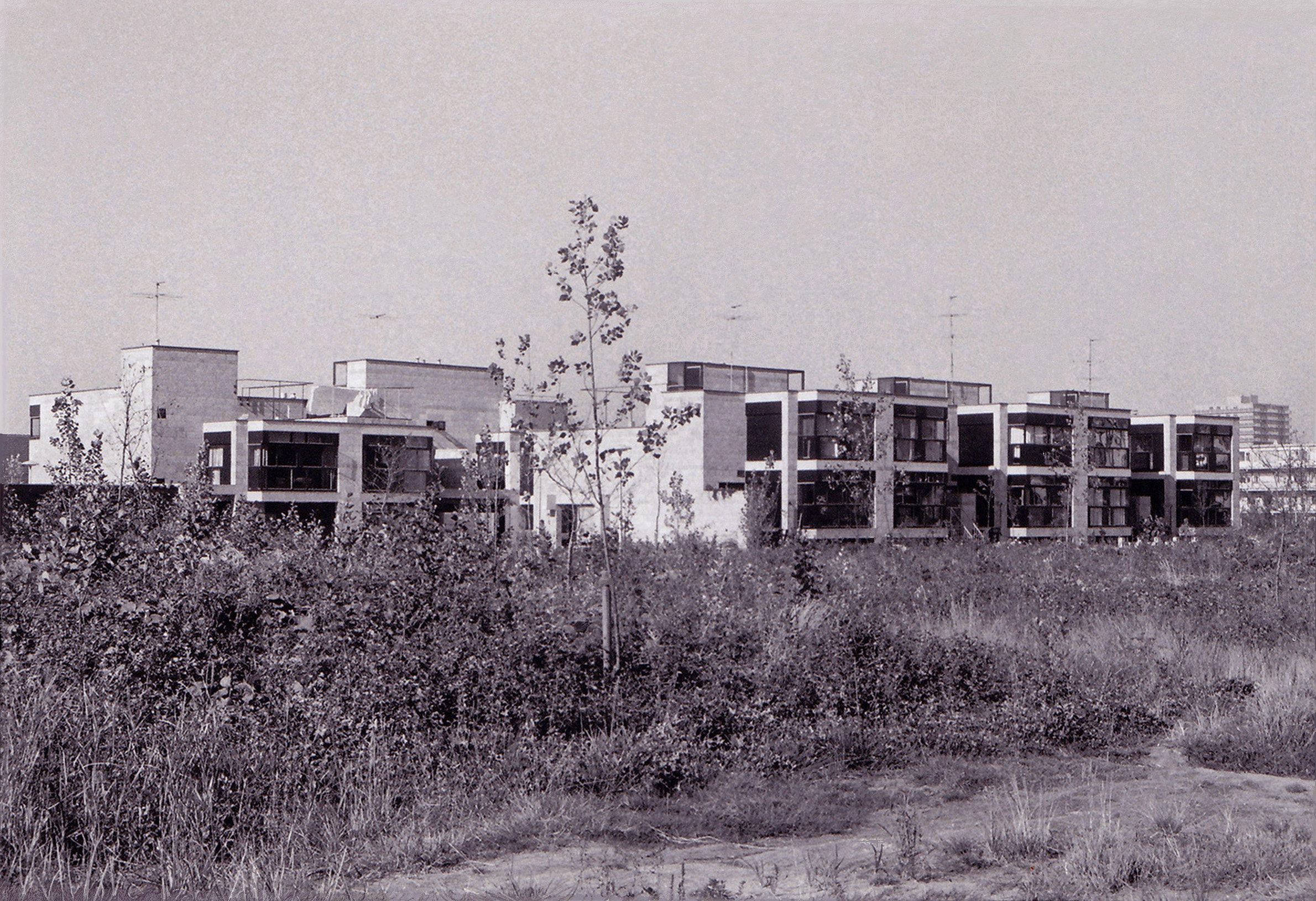
Diagoon housing in Delft, 1971 (Herman Hertzberger)

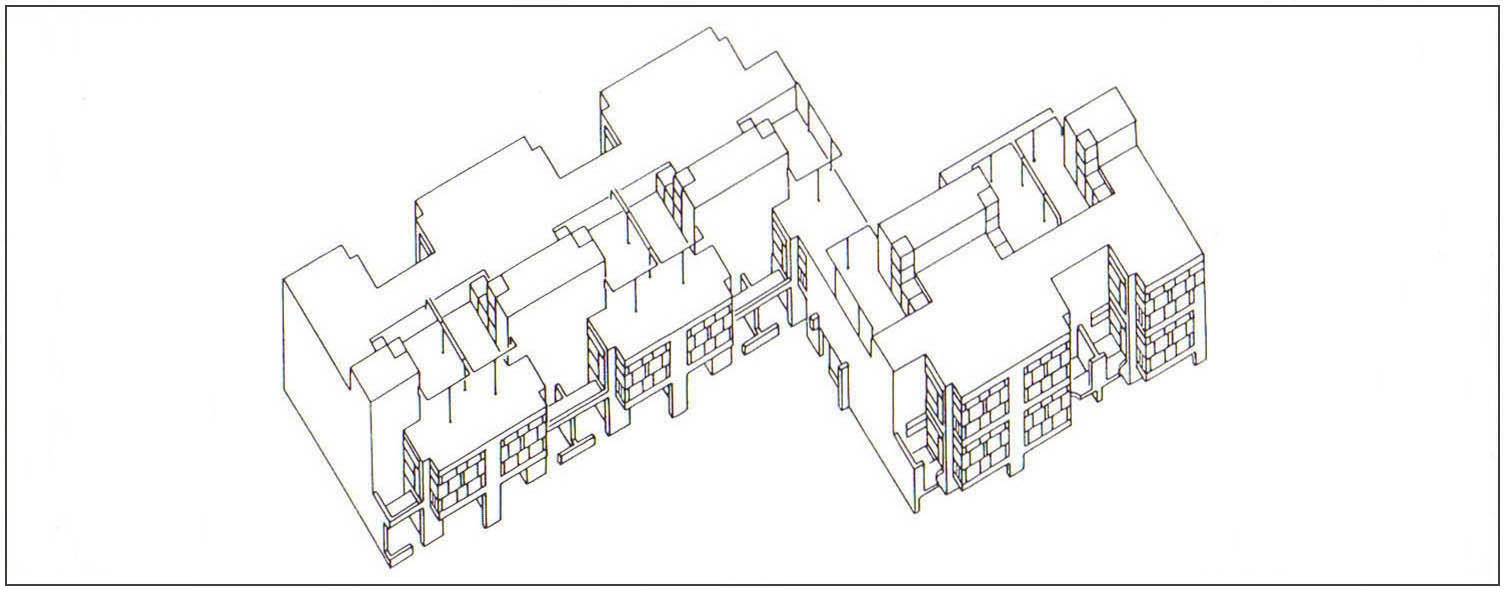
Diagoon housing, basic structure for participation

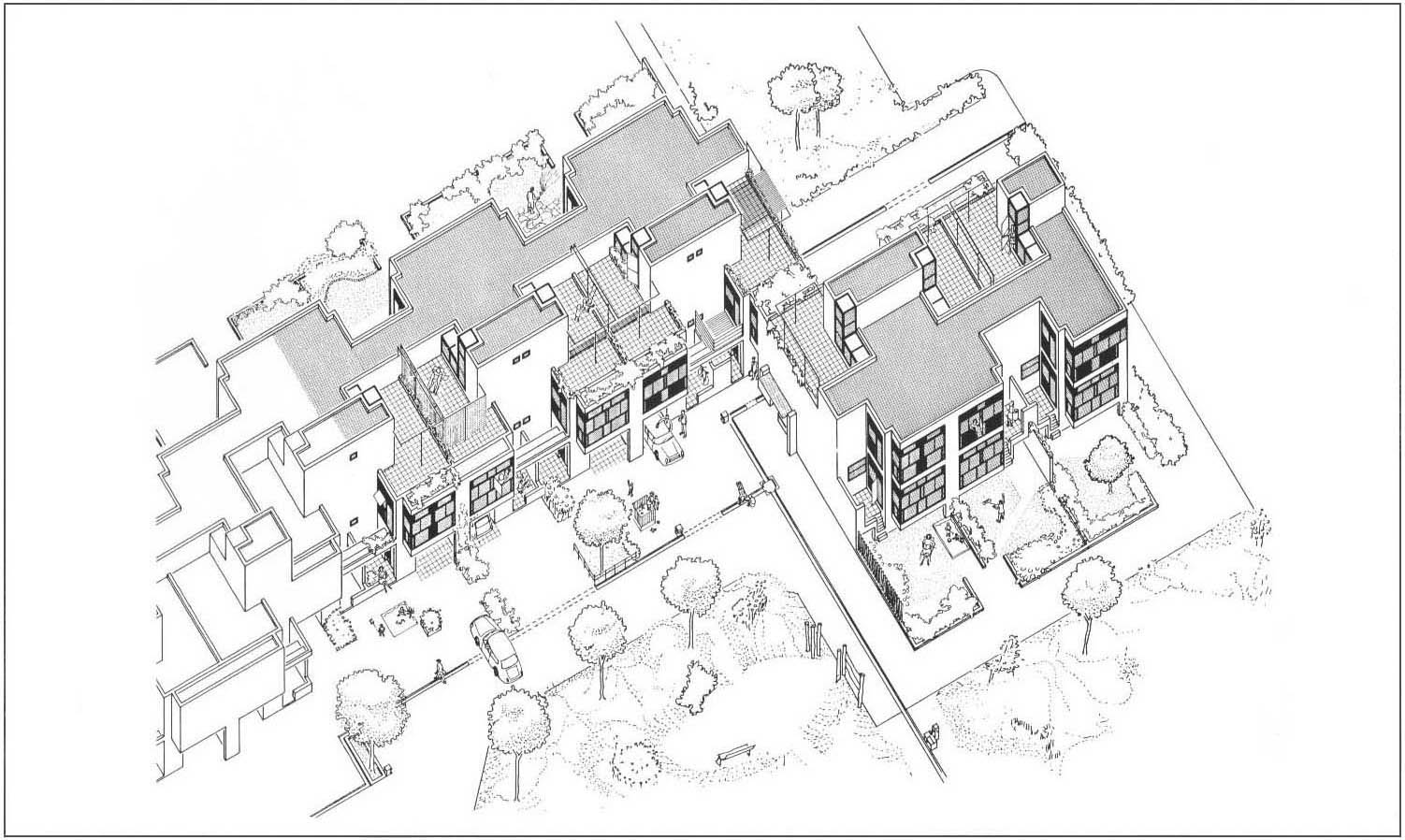
Diagoon housing, participation inside and outside

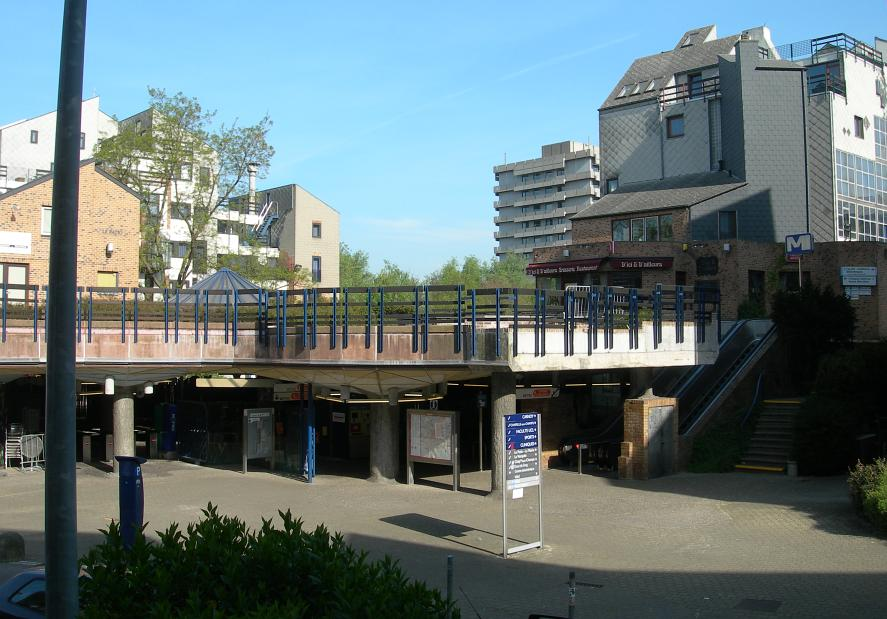
Medical Faculty Housing, Louvain-la-Neuve near Brussels, 1976 (Lucien Kroll)

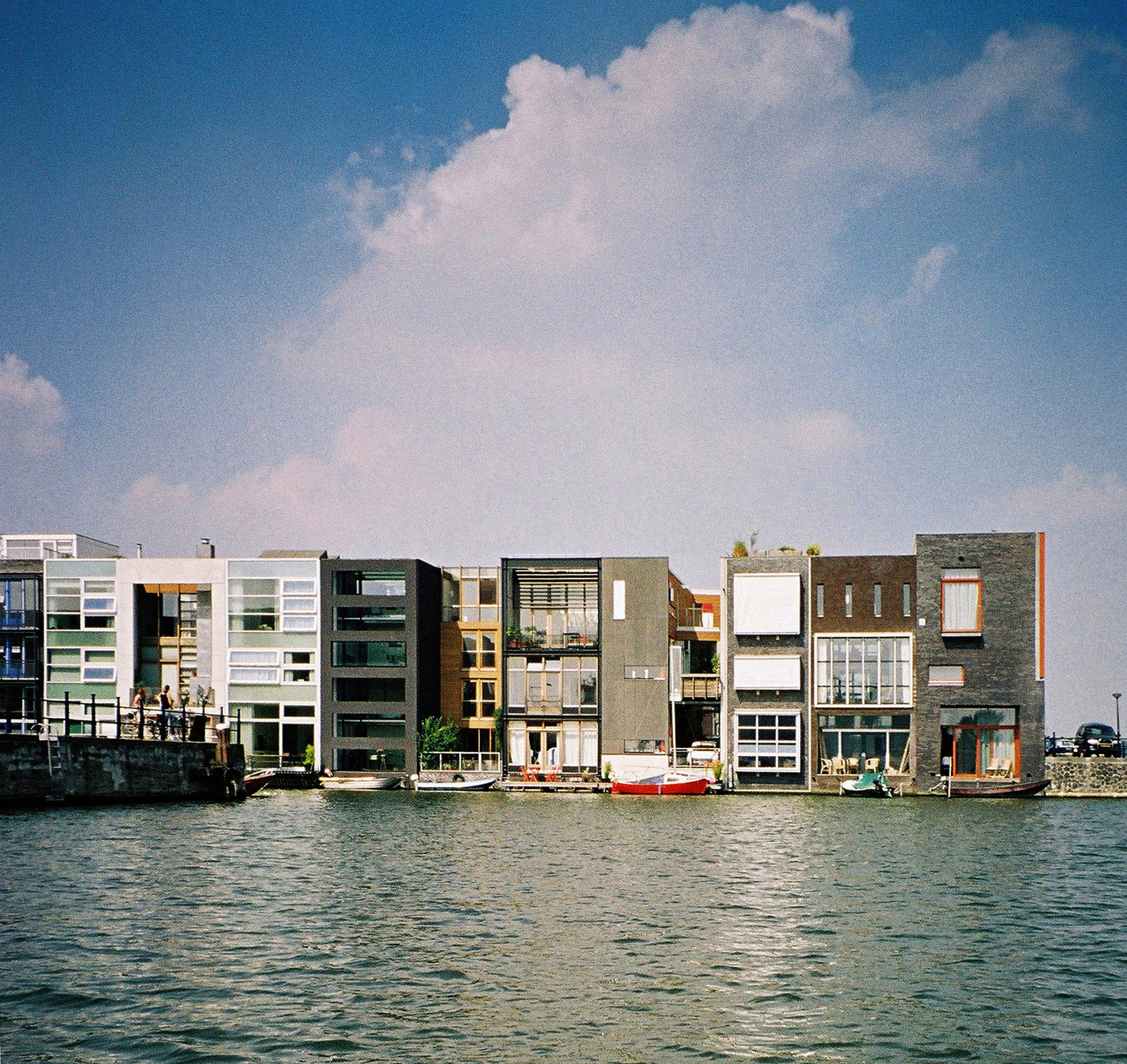
Amsterdam Scheeps- timmermanstraat, cubist style, 1997 (Adriaan Geuze, coordination)

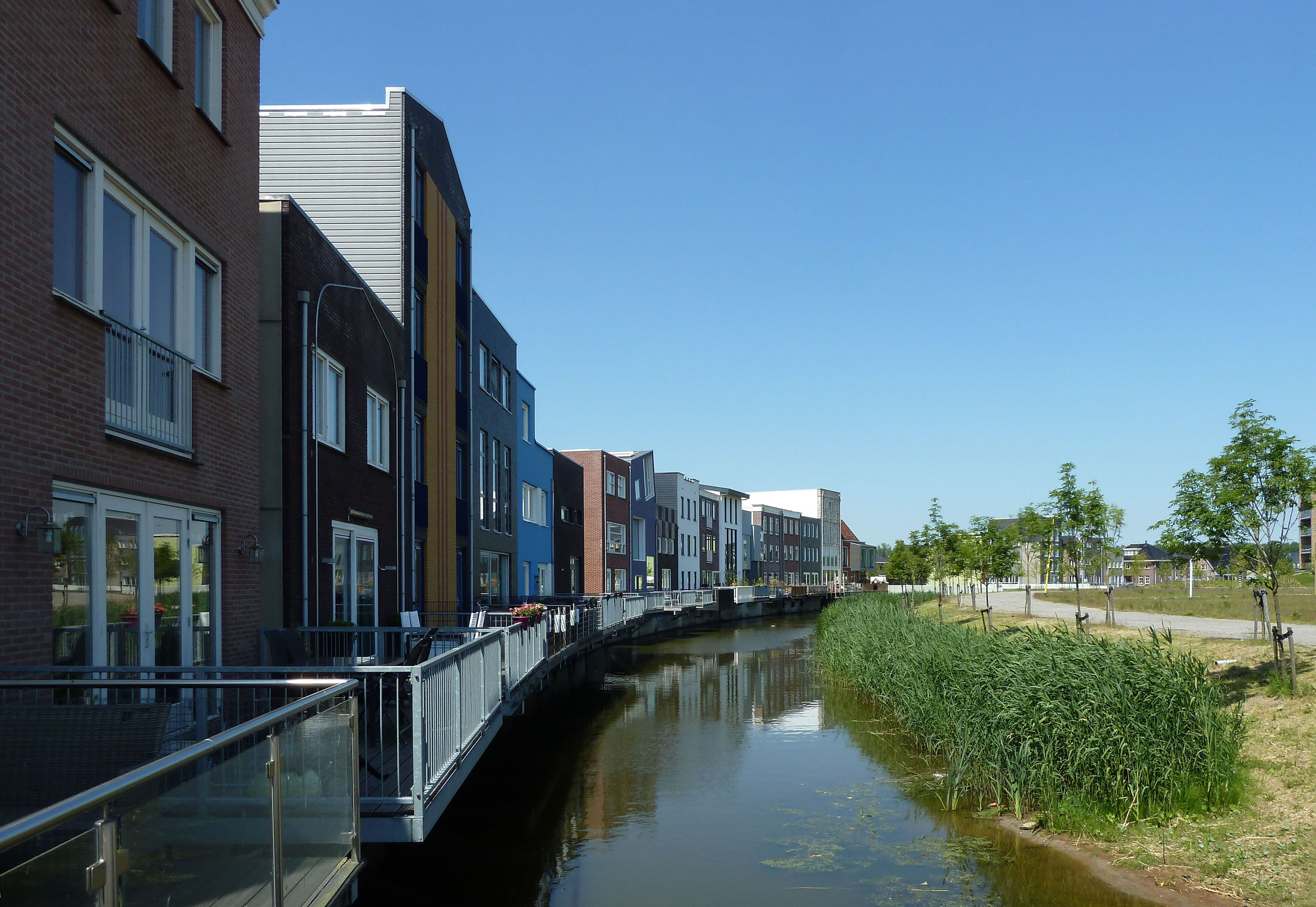
Almere Homerus- kwartier, mix of styles, 2012 (OMA, masterplan and coordination)

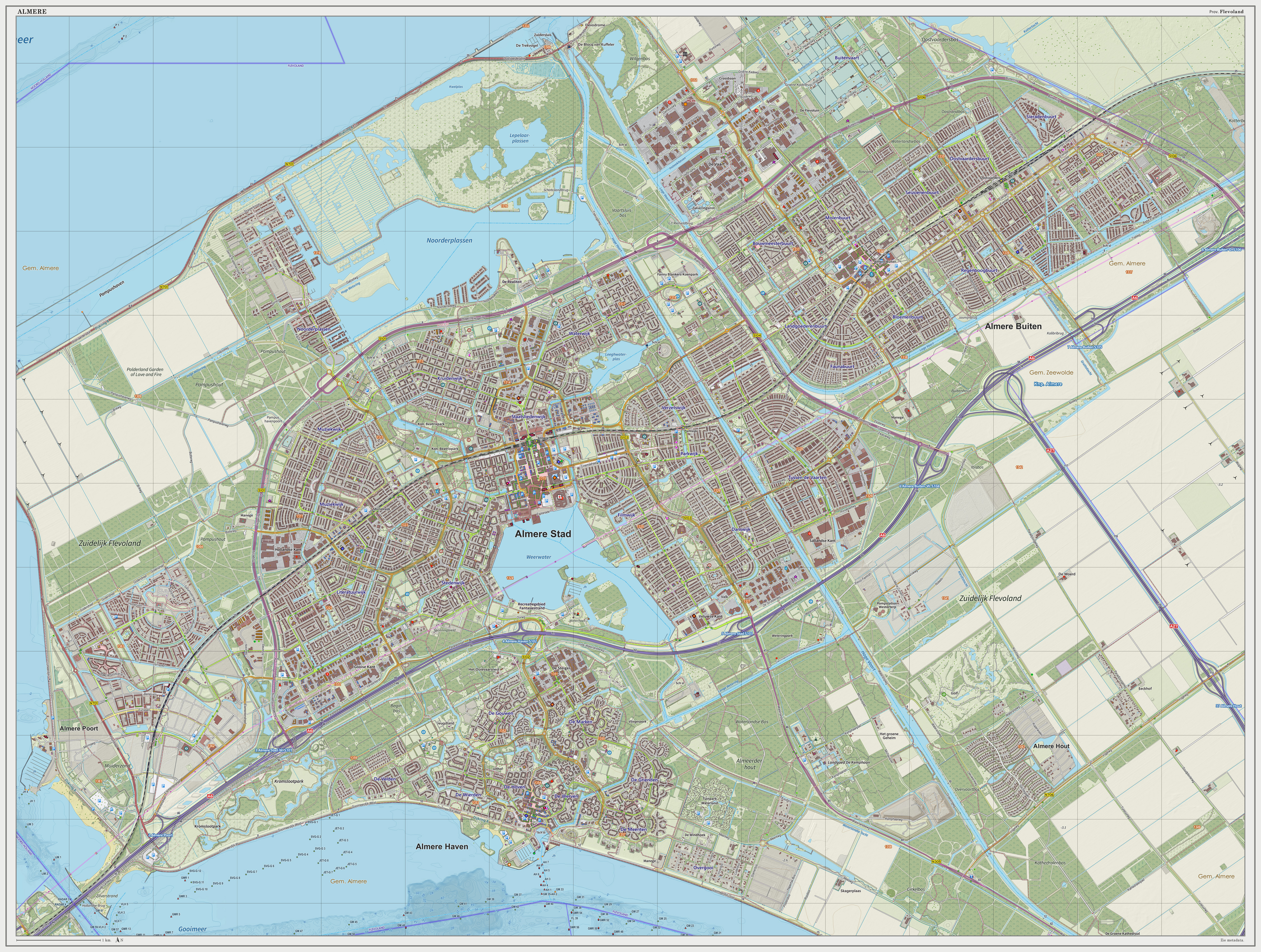
Almere town plan, Homeruskwartier (circle left)

Participation with "Half-houses", five social housing projects in Chile, Mexico and Italy, realized by Alejandro Aravena:

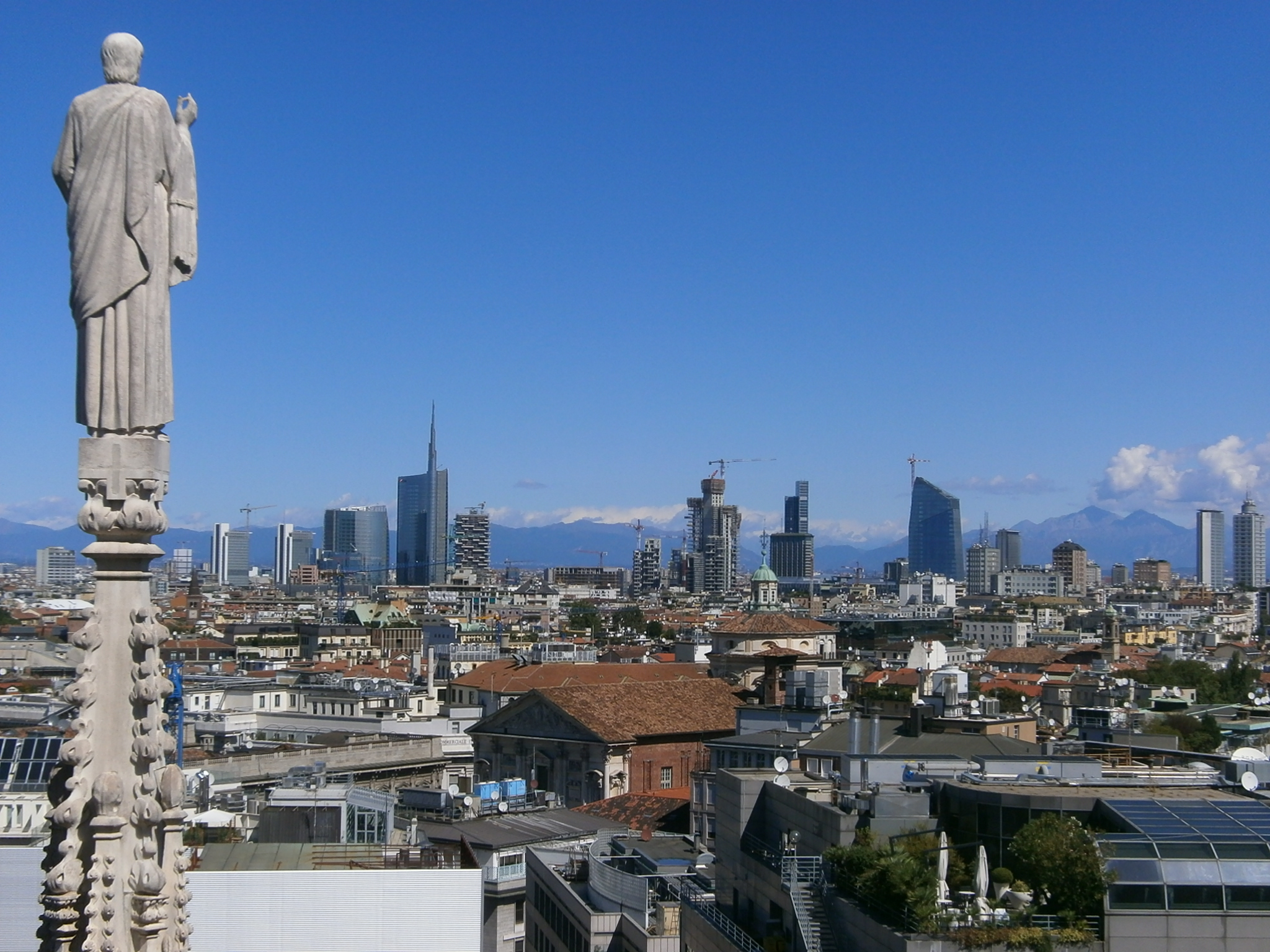
Milan, Triennale, prototype of a "Half-house", 2008

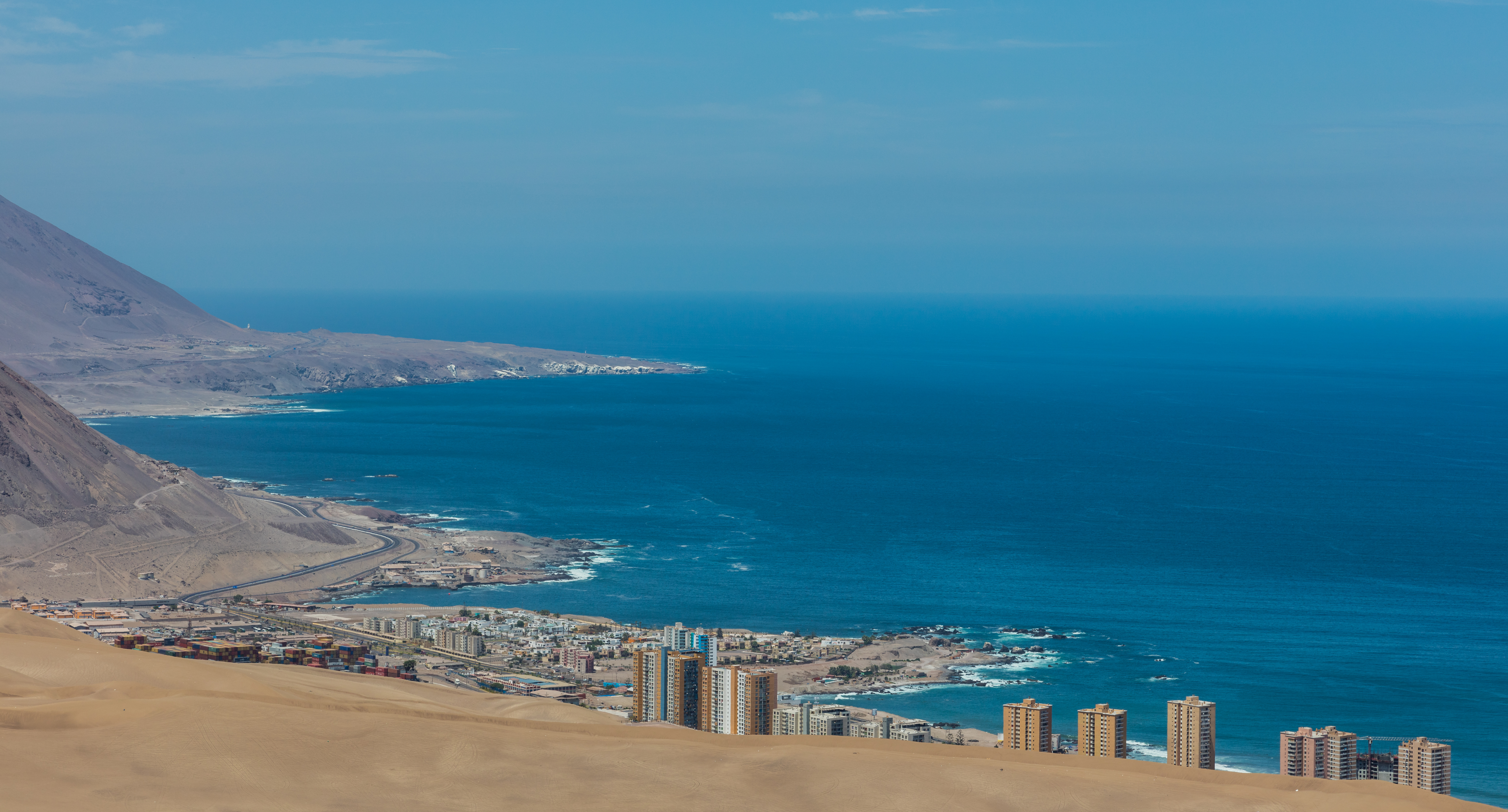
Iquique, Quinta Monroy, 2004

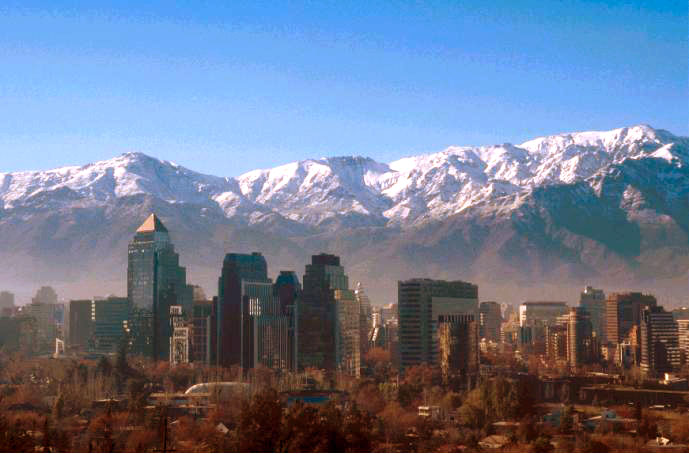
Santiago de Chile, Lo Espejo, Don Francisco, 2007

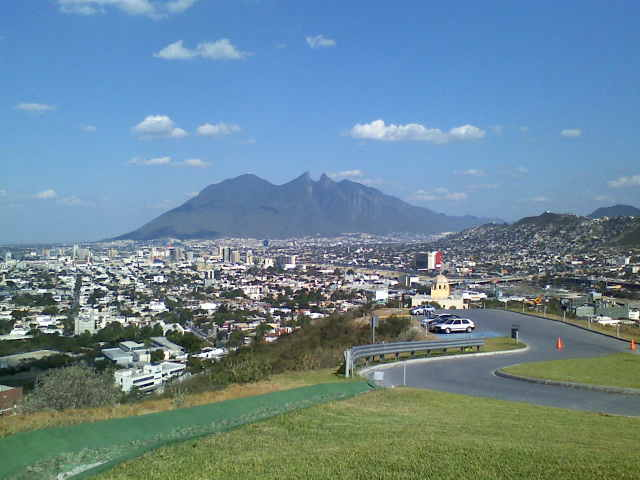
Monterrey, Las Anacuas, 2010

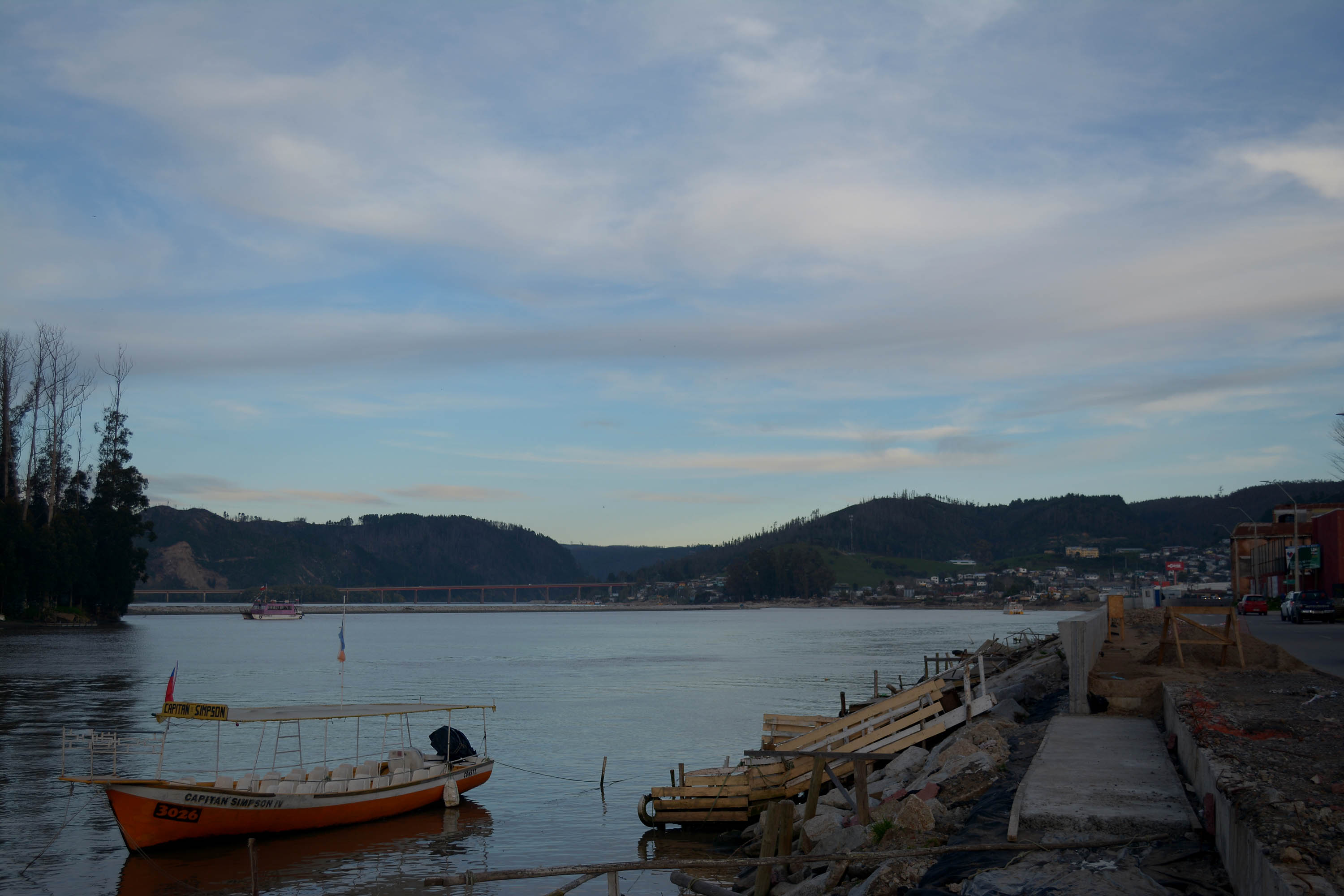
Constitución, Villa Verde, Rio Loncamilla, 2016

=== Other structures ===
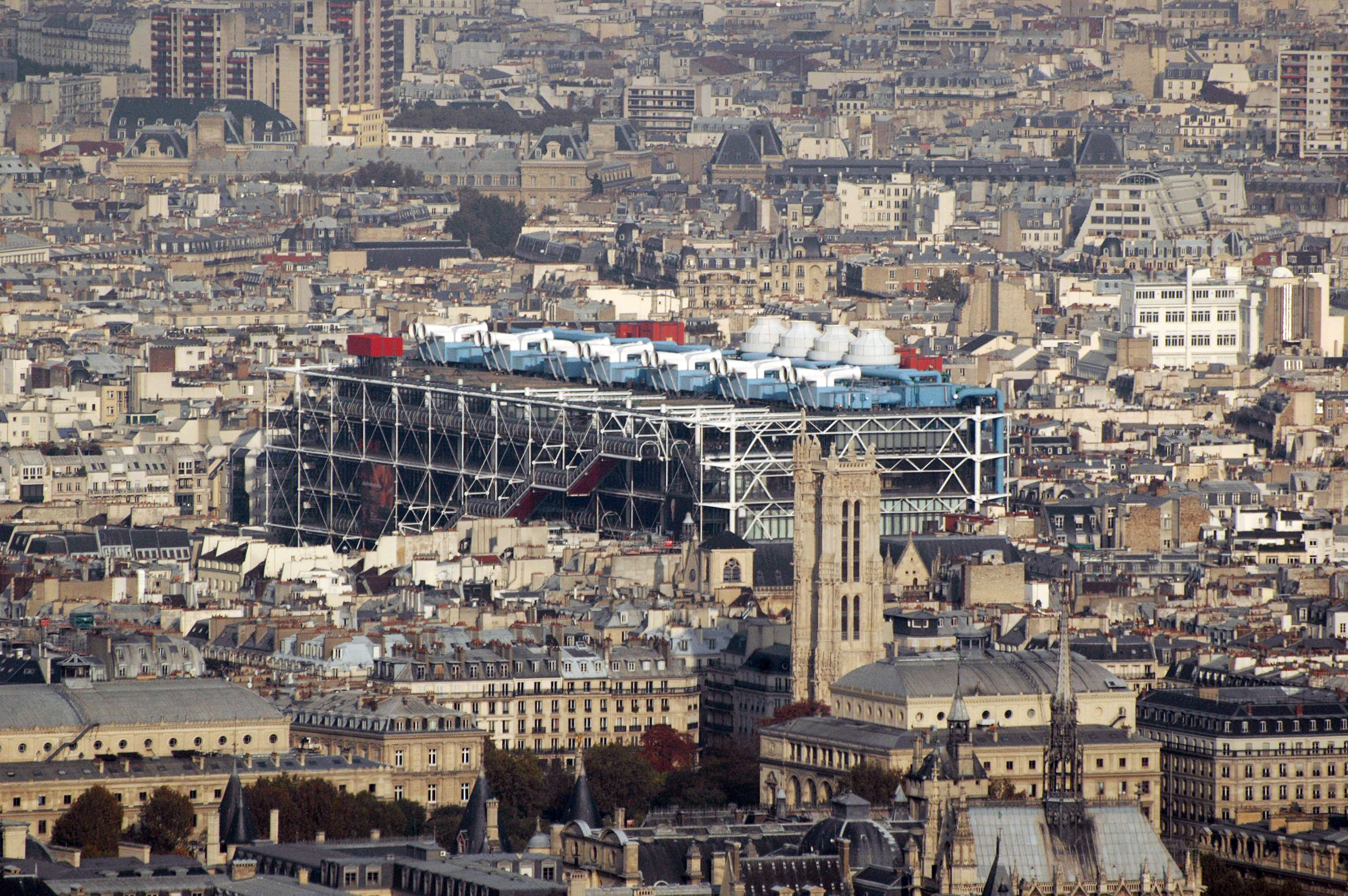
Centre Pompidou in Paris, "Megastructure", 1977 (Renzo Piano & Richard Rogers)

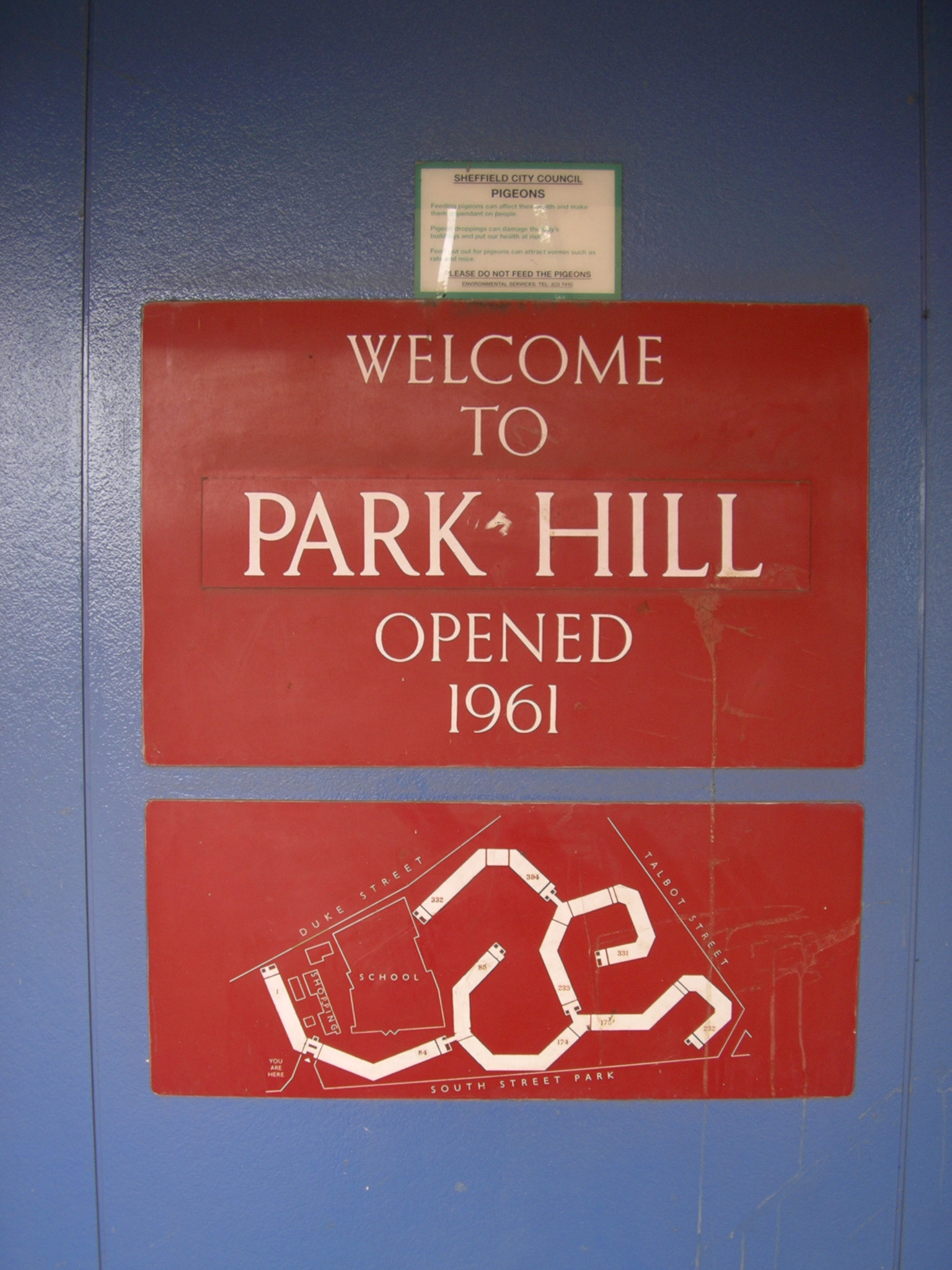
Park Hill housing estate in Sheffield, "Gridless structure", 1961 (Jack Lynn & Ivor Smith)

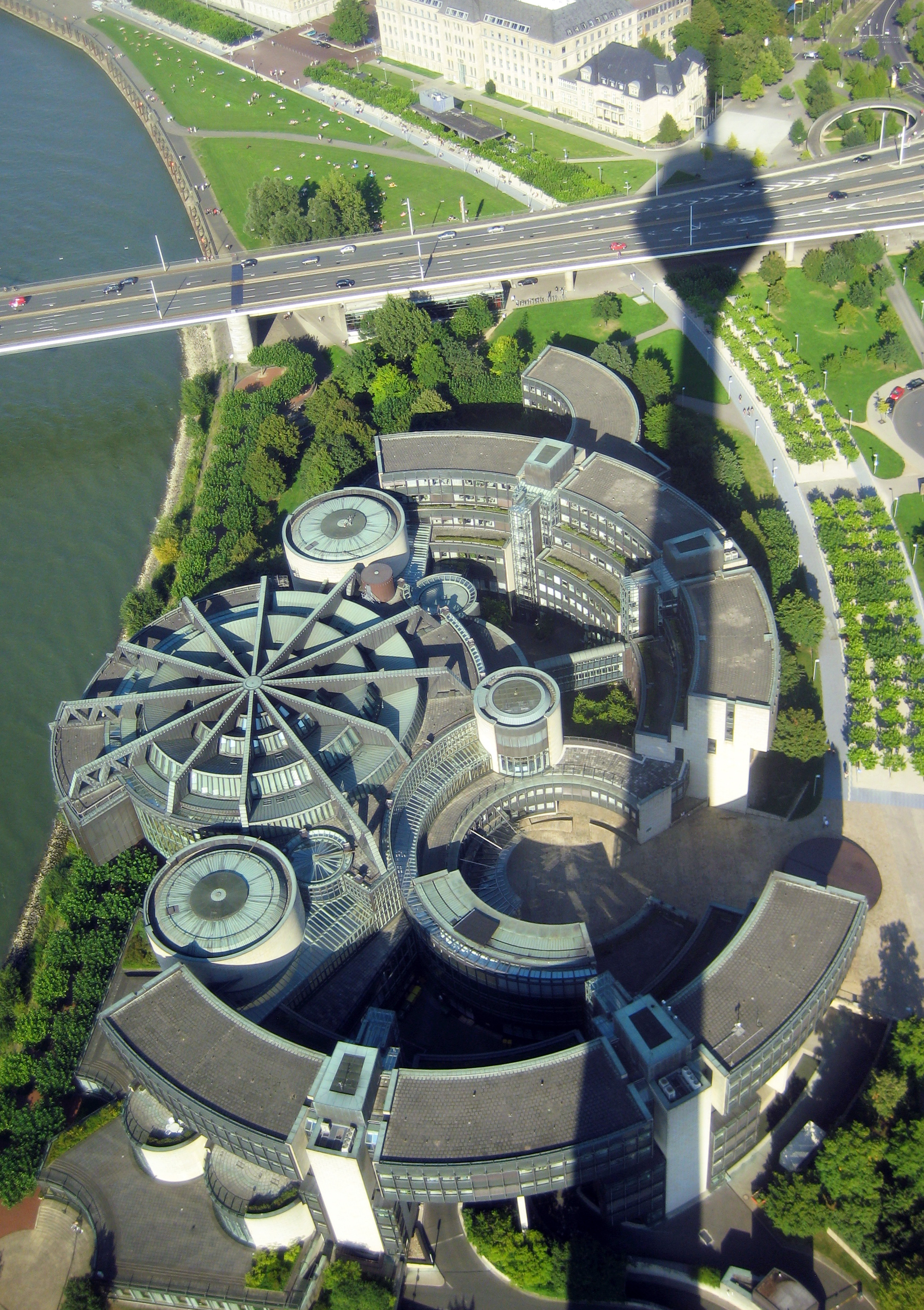
Parliament building of North Rhine-Westphalia in Düsseldorf, 1979–1988

== Urban structuring – the art of town planning – overarching structures ==
=== Historic cities ===
Examples of urban planning and urban structuring. About the relation between historic and contemporary architecture Le Corbusier wrote: "I was labelled a revolutionary, whereas my greatest teacher was the Past. My so-called revolutionary ideas are straight out of the history of architecture itself." Quotation in No.2.

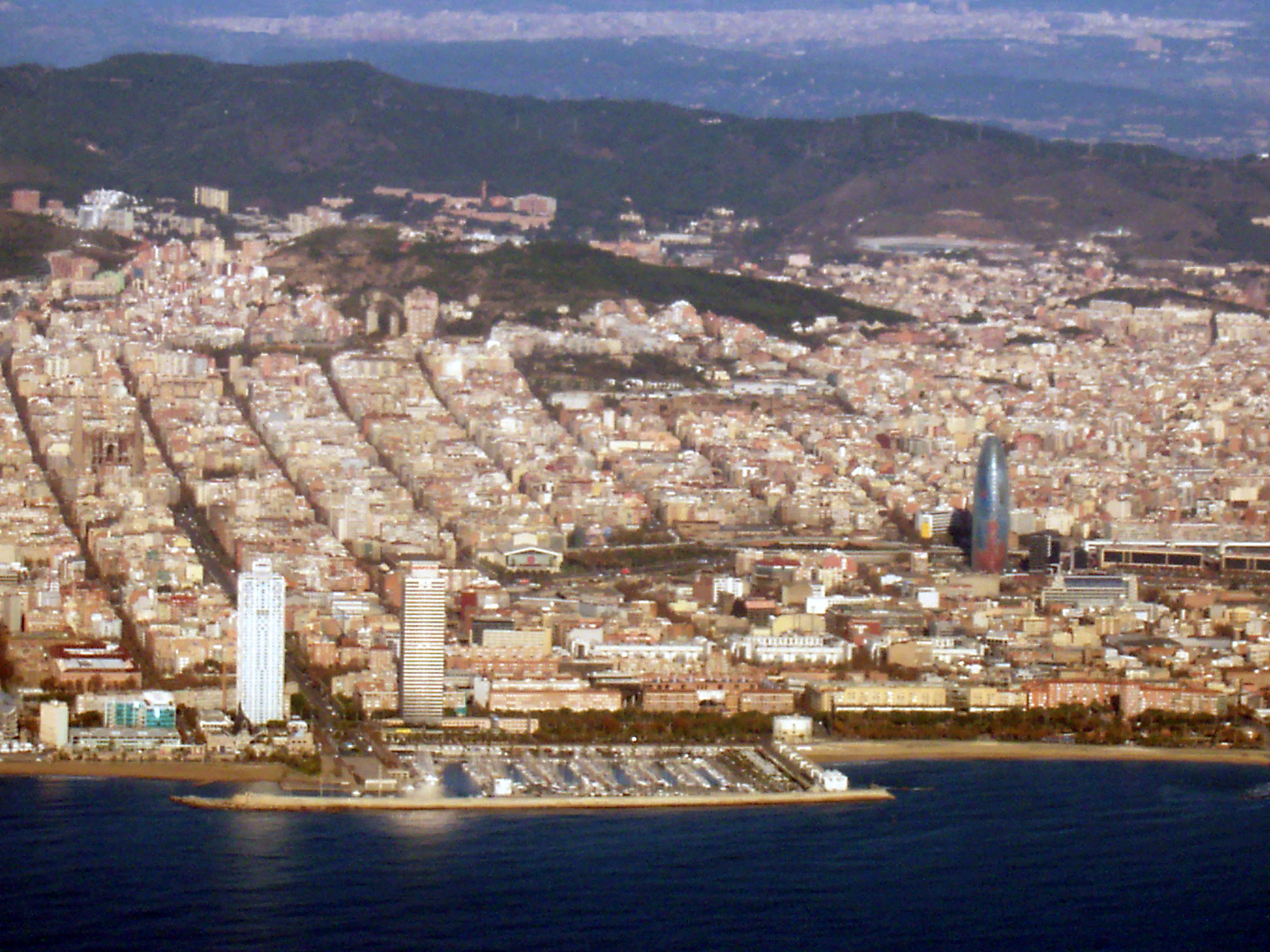
Barcelona, Gridiron Plan 1859

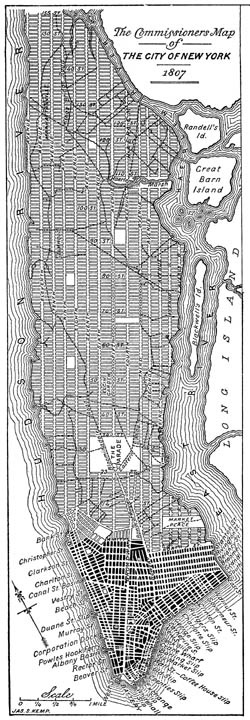
Manhattan, Gridiron Plan 1807

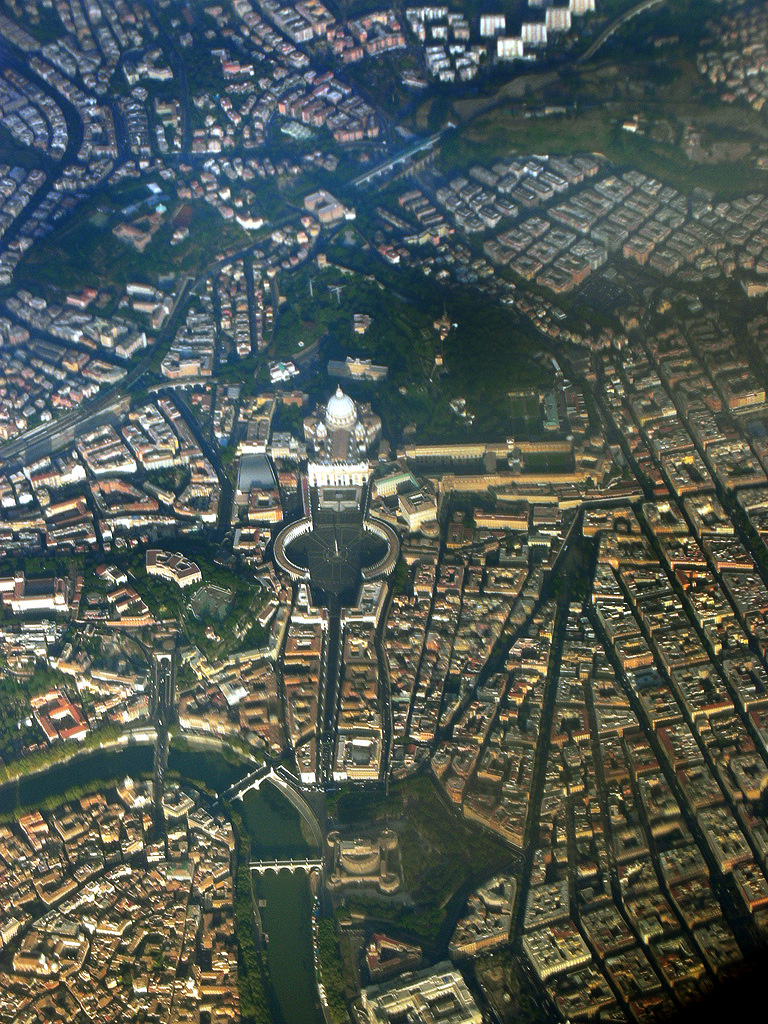
Rome, Symmetries Axes River Hills etc.

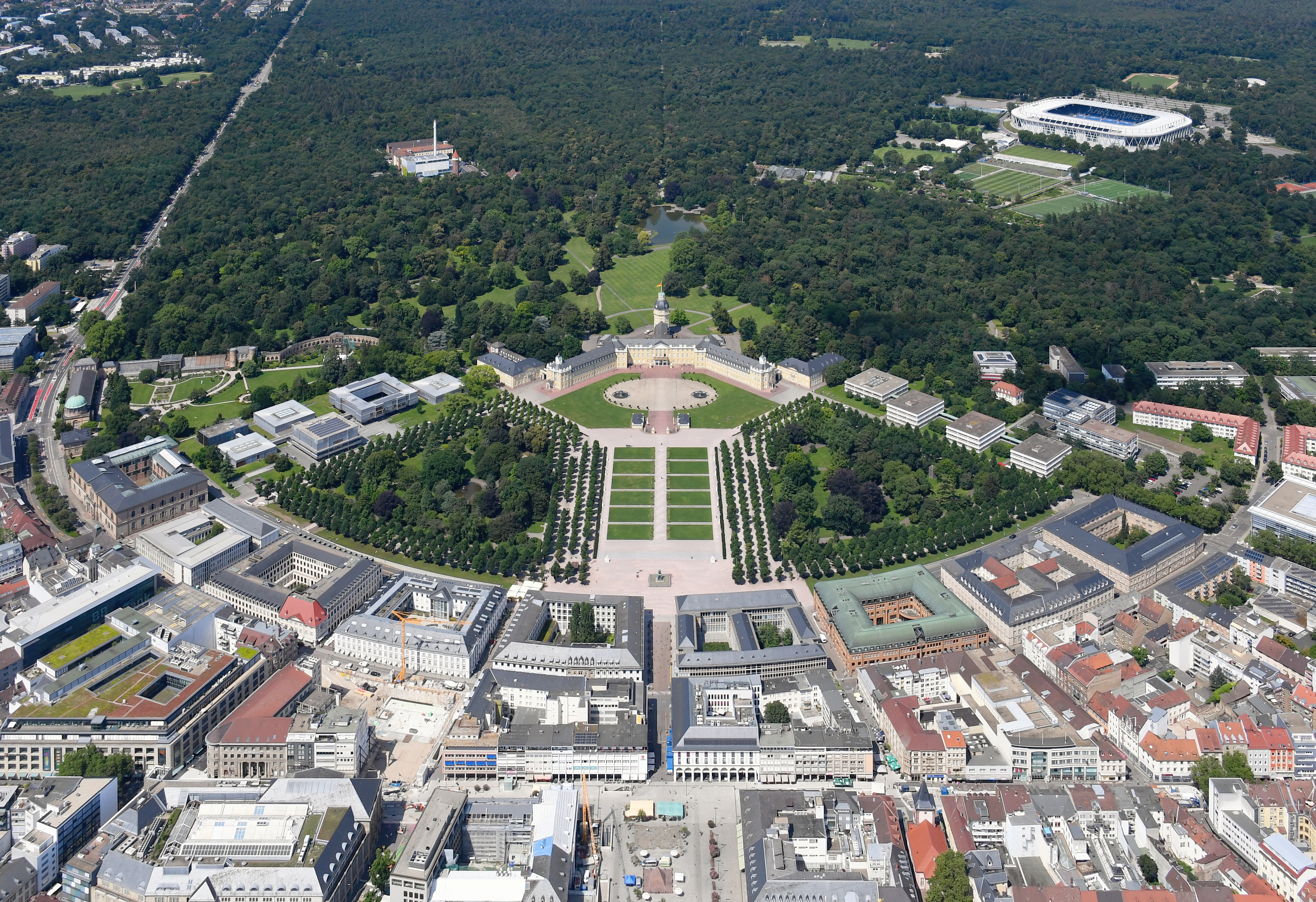
Karlsruhe, Basic structure: Radial

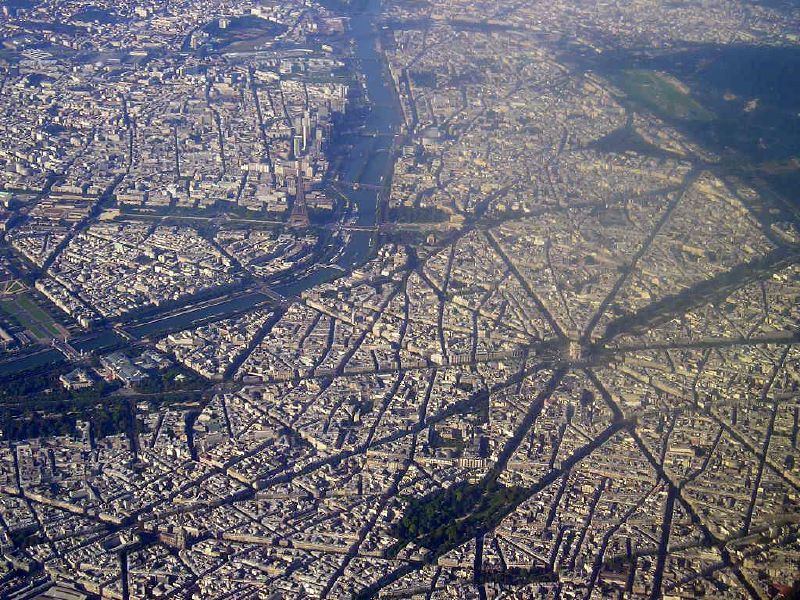
Paris, Radial structure Axes Symmetries River

Washington, D.C., L'Enfant Plan 1792

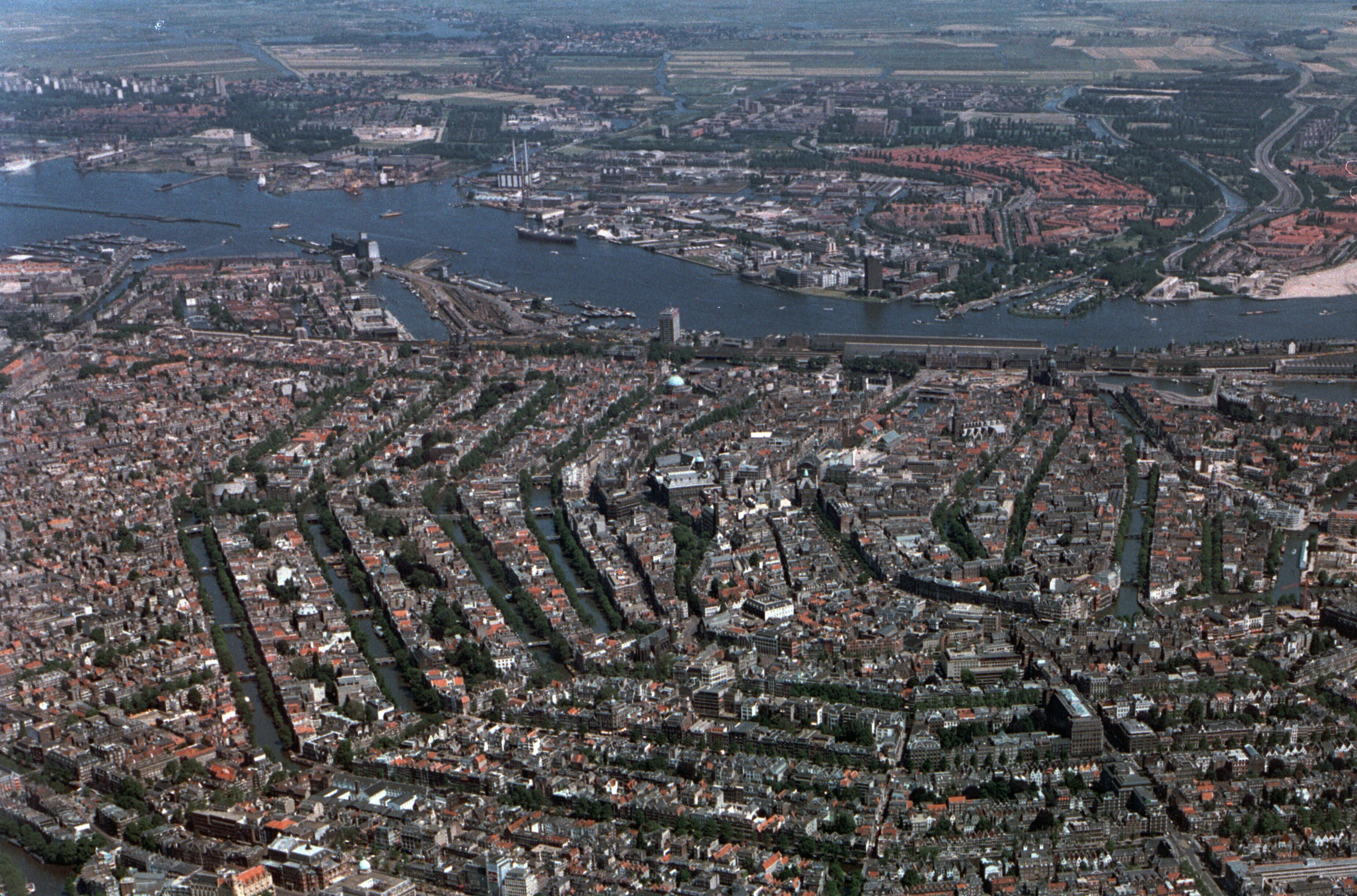
Amsterdam, Basic structure: U-shape

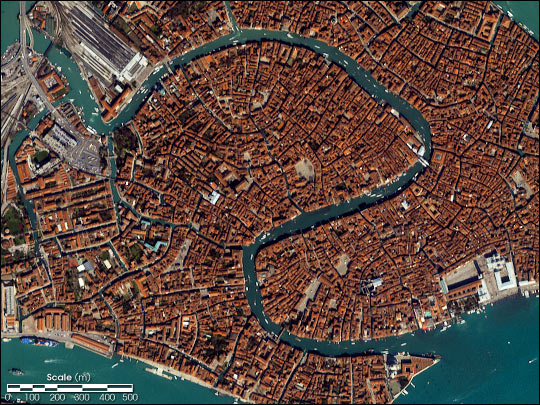
Venice, Basic structure: S-shape

=== Historic cities – reciprocity of form ===
In Forum 2/1962 Jacob Bakema made a study on the principle "reciprocity of form" and "participation", especially on the Diocletian's Palace in Split. In Forum 3/1962 Herman Hertzberger did research on the Roman amphitheatres in Arles and Lucca. Later, in 1966 the idea of the amphitheatre in Arles was taken over by Aldo Rossi in his book The Architecture of the City. In 1976 Reyner Banham presented the Ponte Vecchio in Florence as one of the historic prototypes in his book Megastructure.

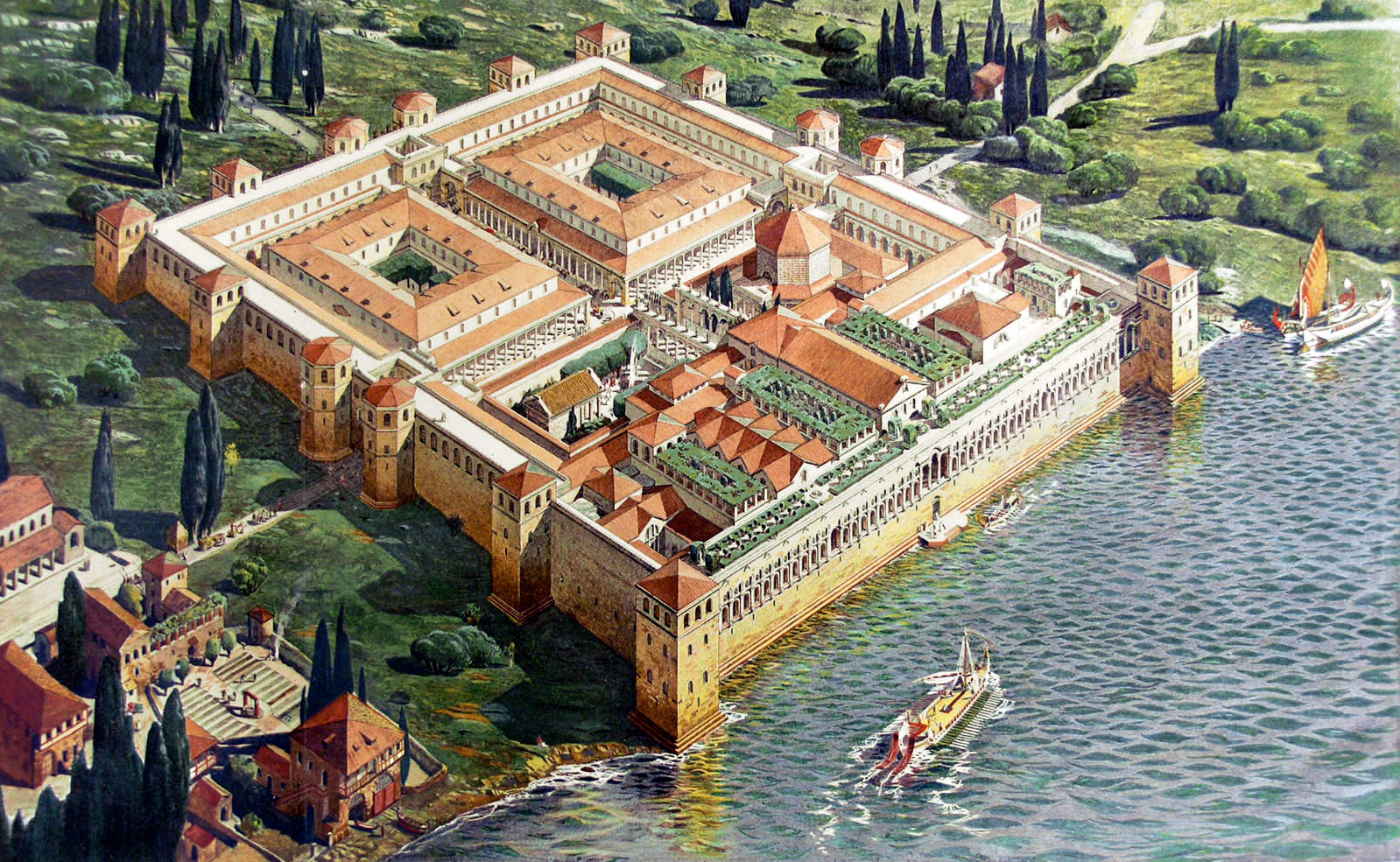
Diocletian's Palace, original state, 305

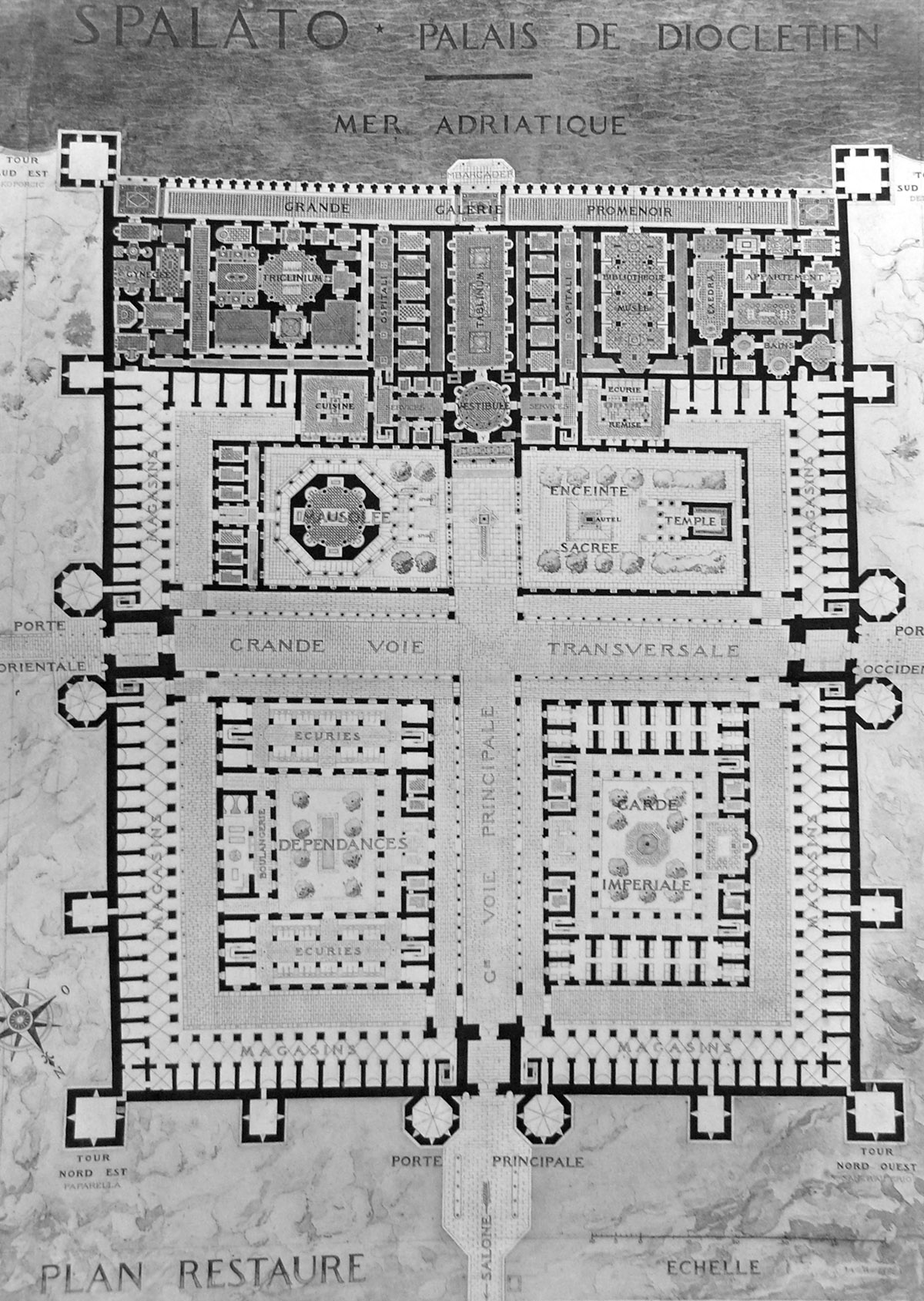
Diocletian's Palace, original plan

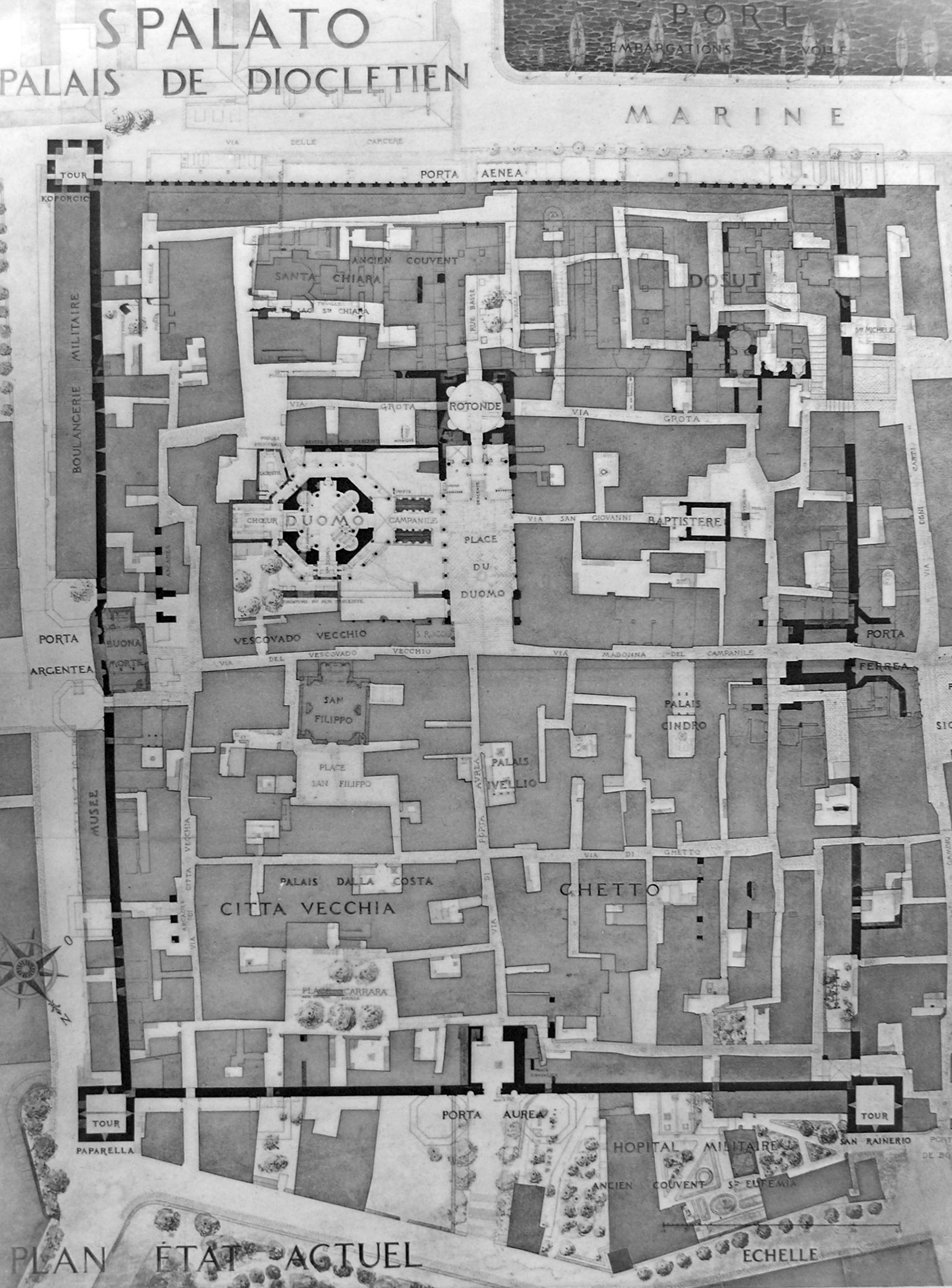
Diocletian's Palace transformed into a town, Split 1912

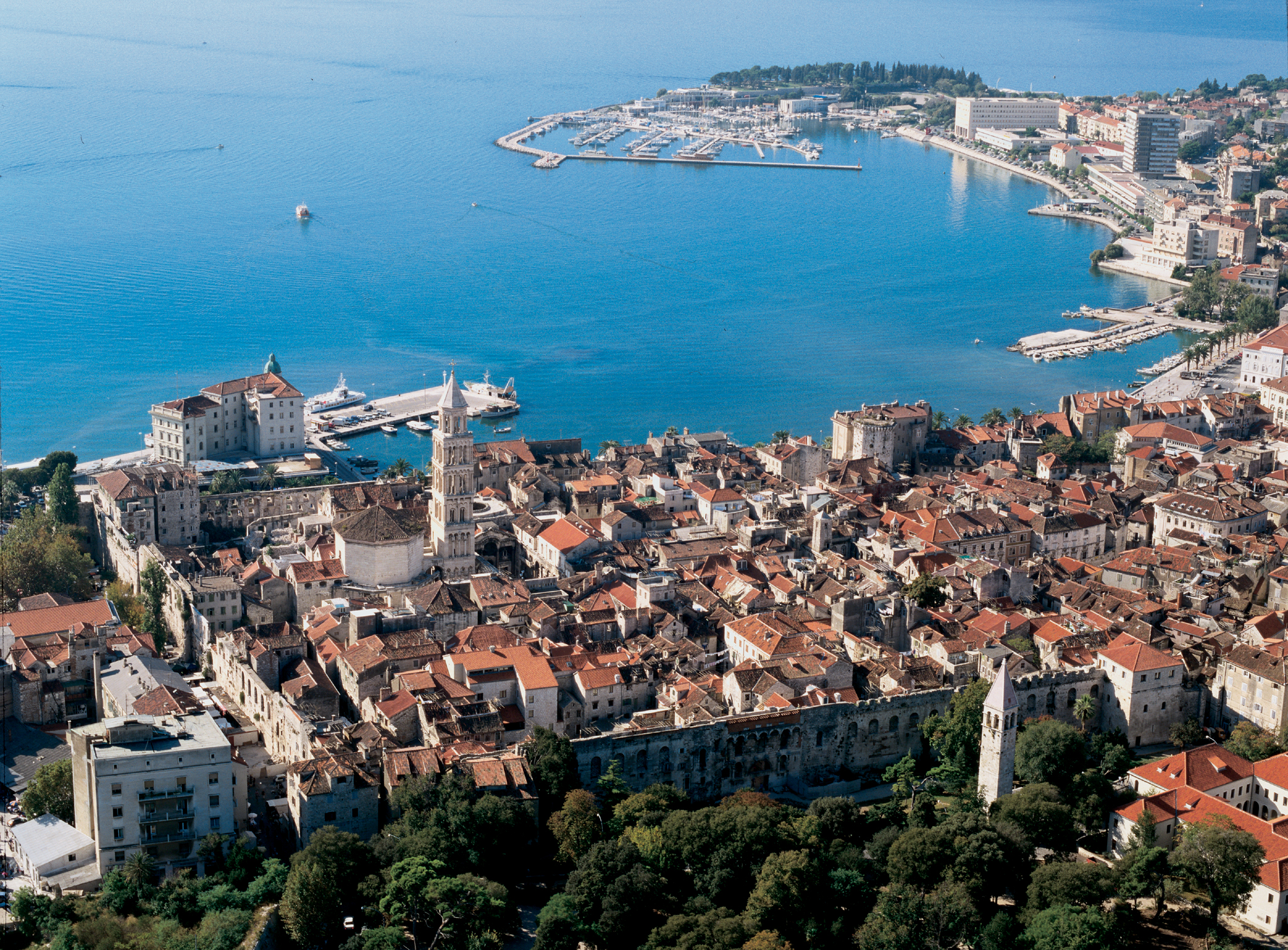
Split and Diocletian's Palace, 21st century

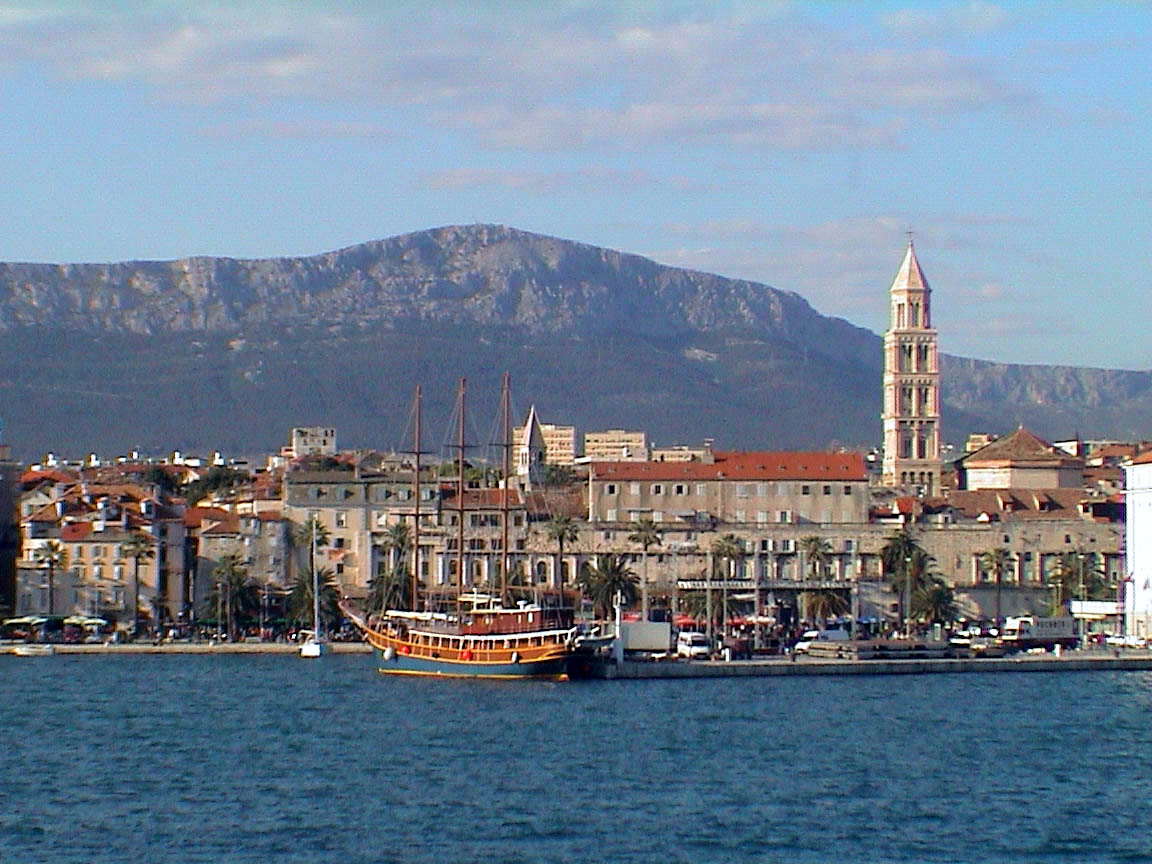
Split

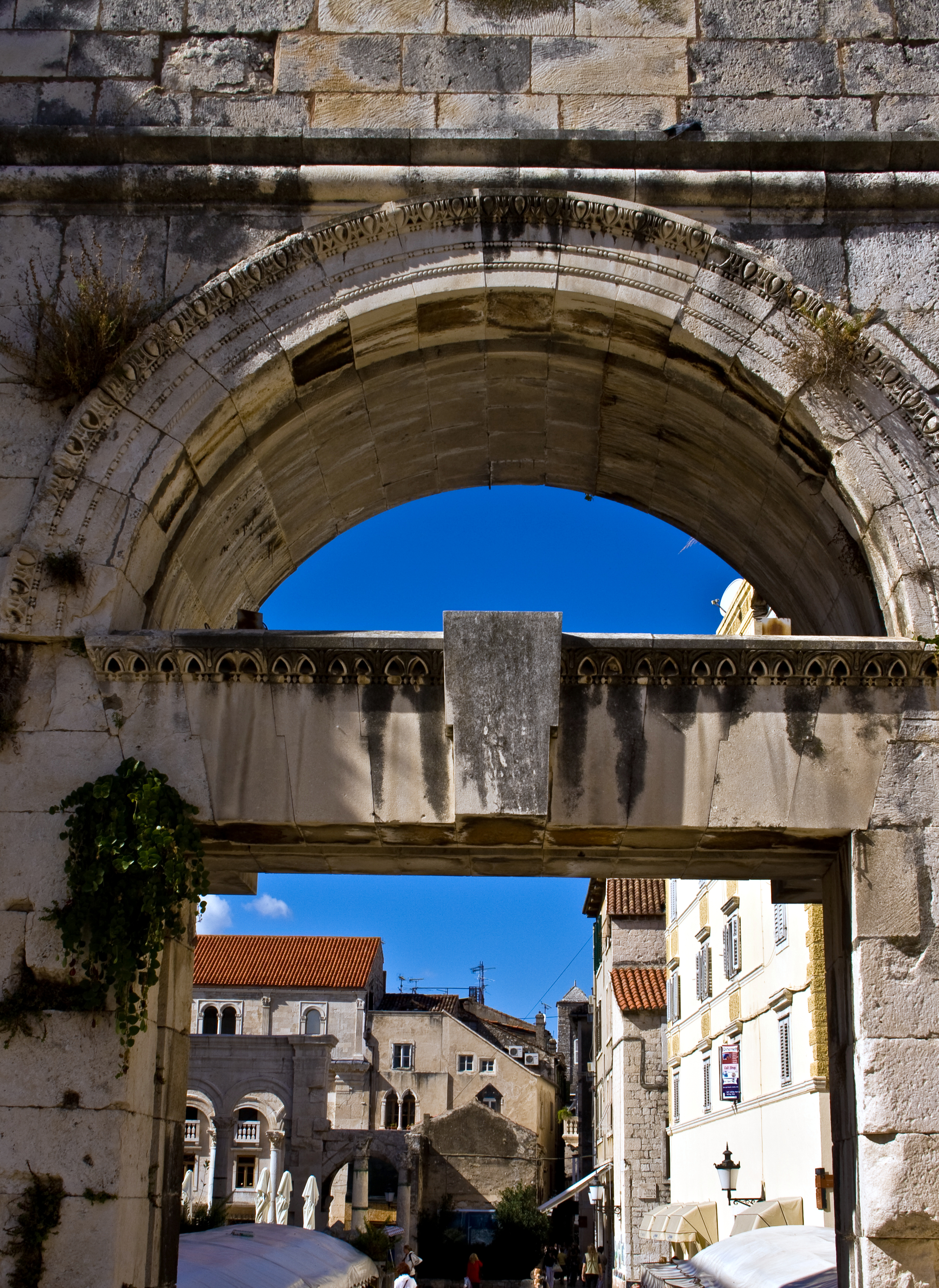
Split

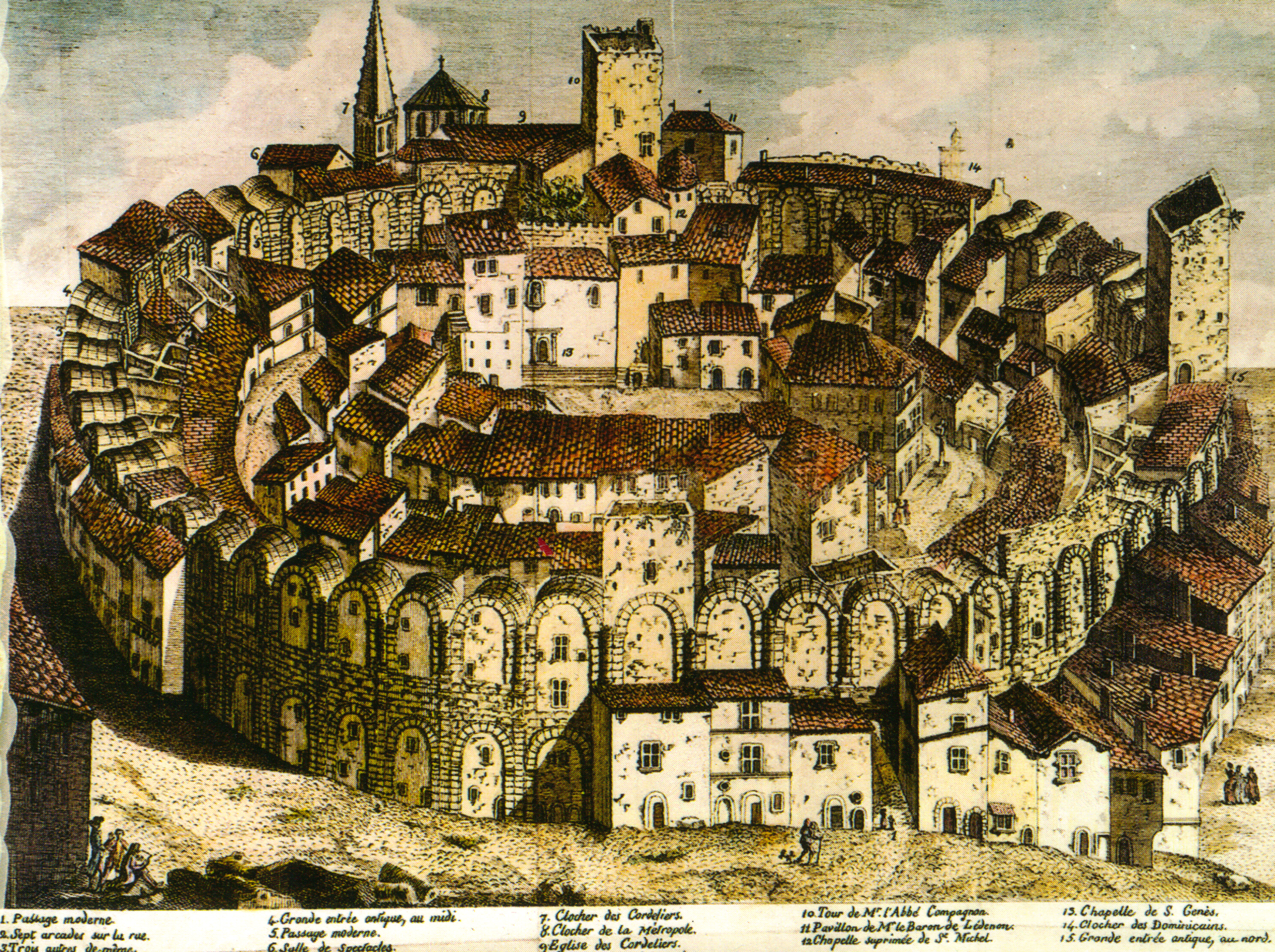
Arles, Roman amphi- theatre, built in 90 AD, transformed into a town 600–1830

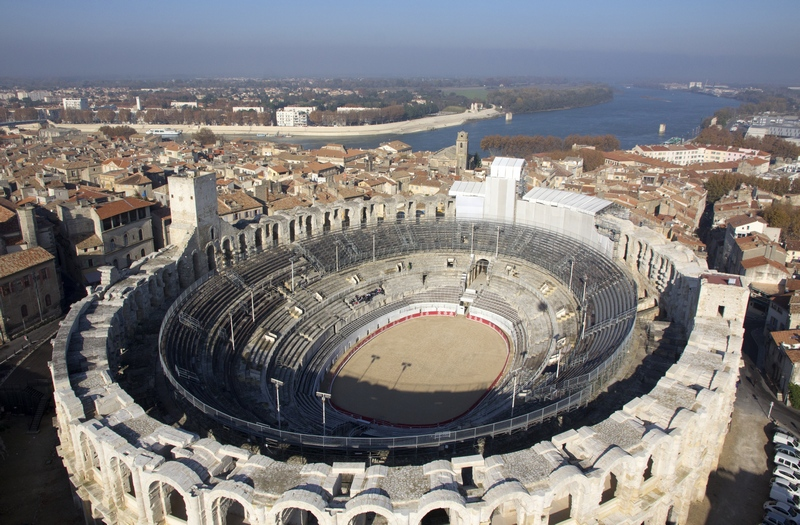
Arles, Roman amphi- theatre, reused as an arena since 1830

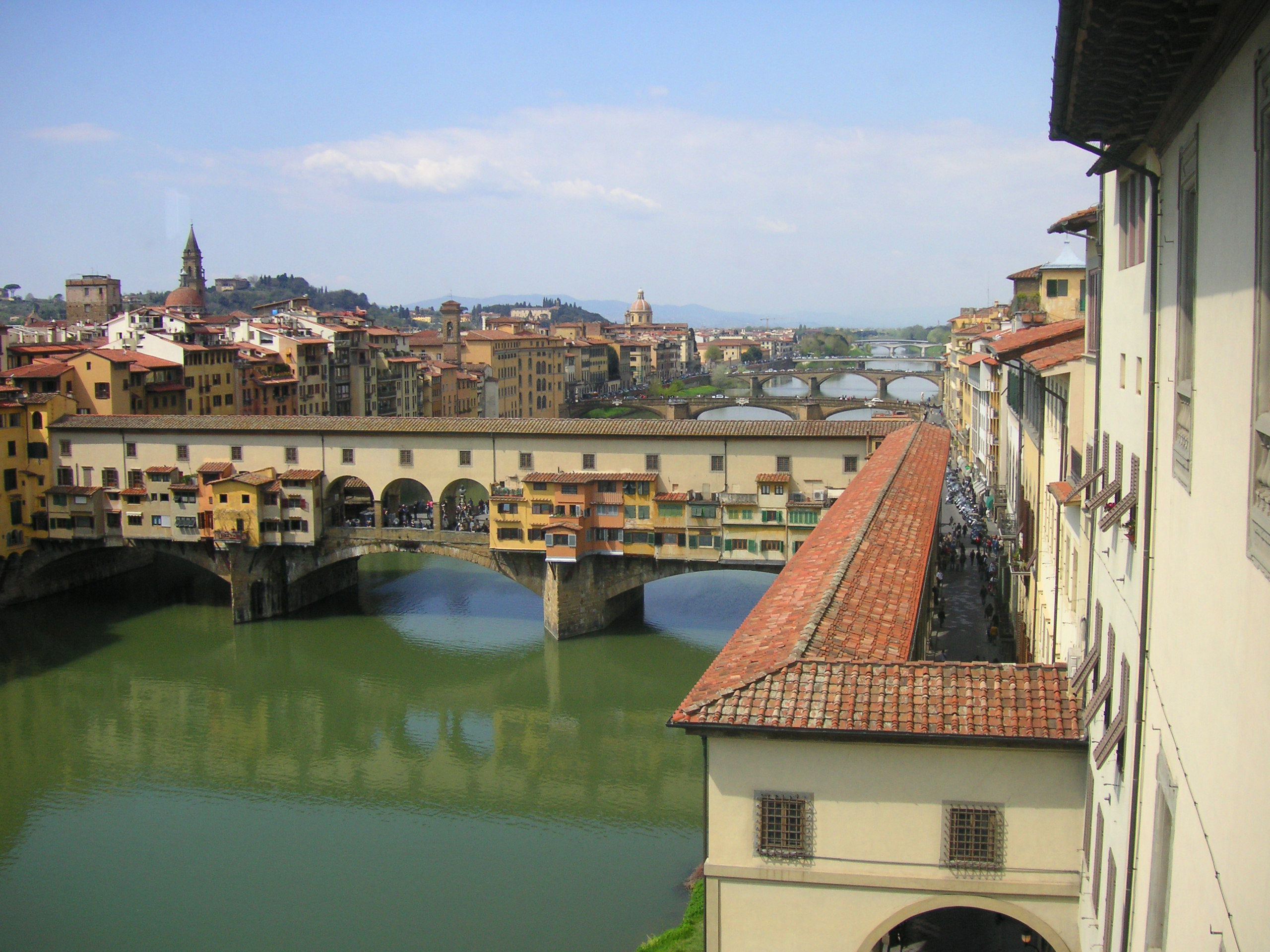
Florence, Ponte Vecchio, Structure and coincidence

=== New cities ===
New cities in the 20th century. The term "Urban Structuring" is introduced by Alison and Peter Smithson, the term "Articulations" (of the built volume) by Herman Hertzberger. Both terms are used as a title of an architectural book.

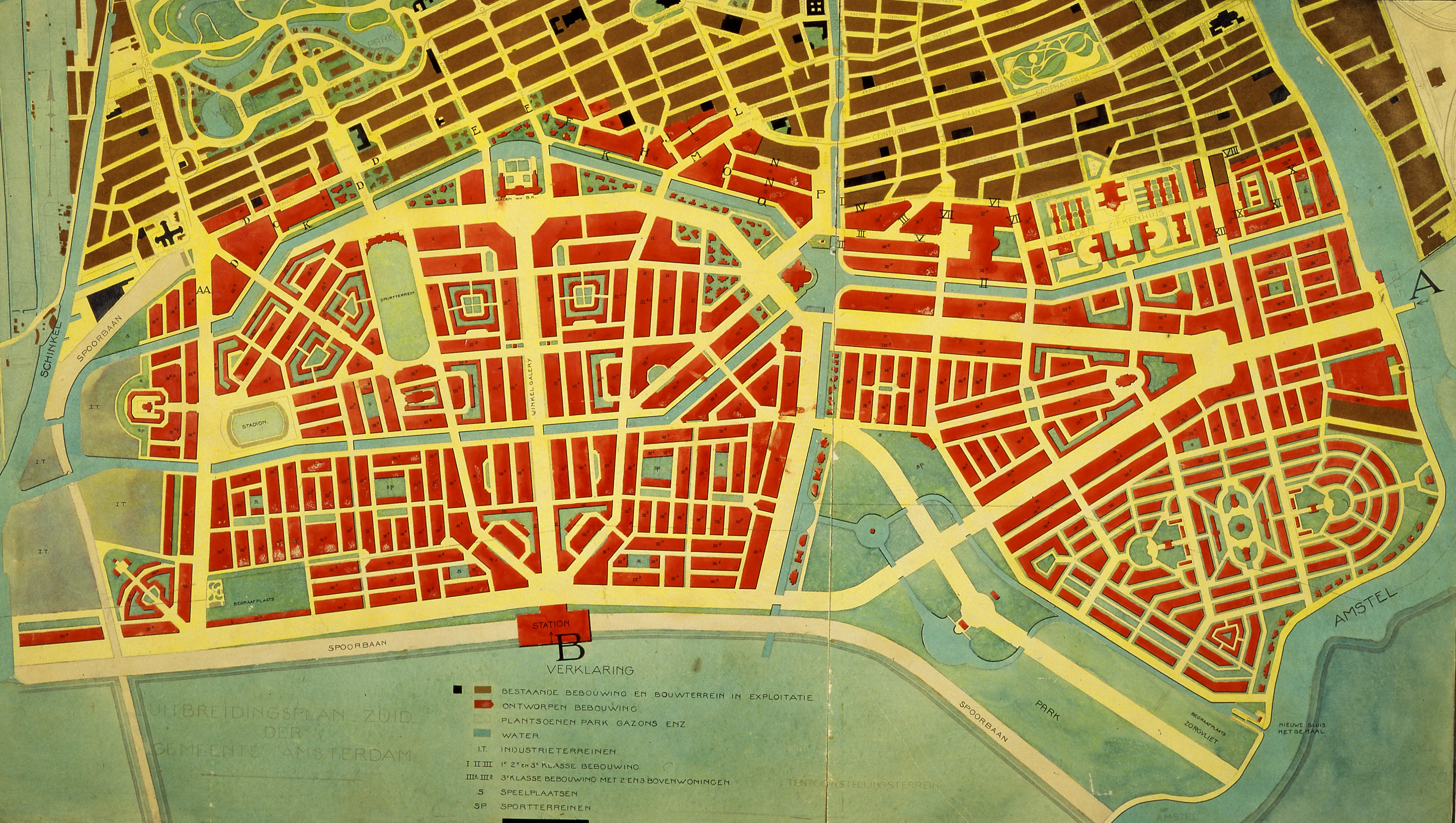
Amsterdam, Plan Zuid, urban plan by Berlage 1915, architecture of the Amsterdam School

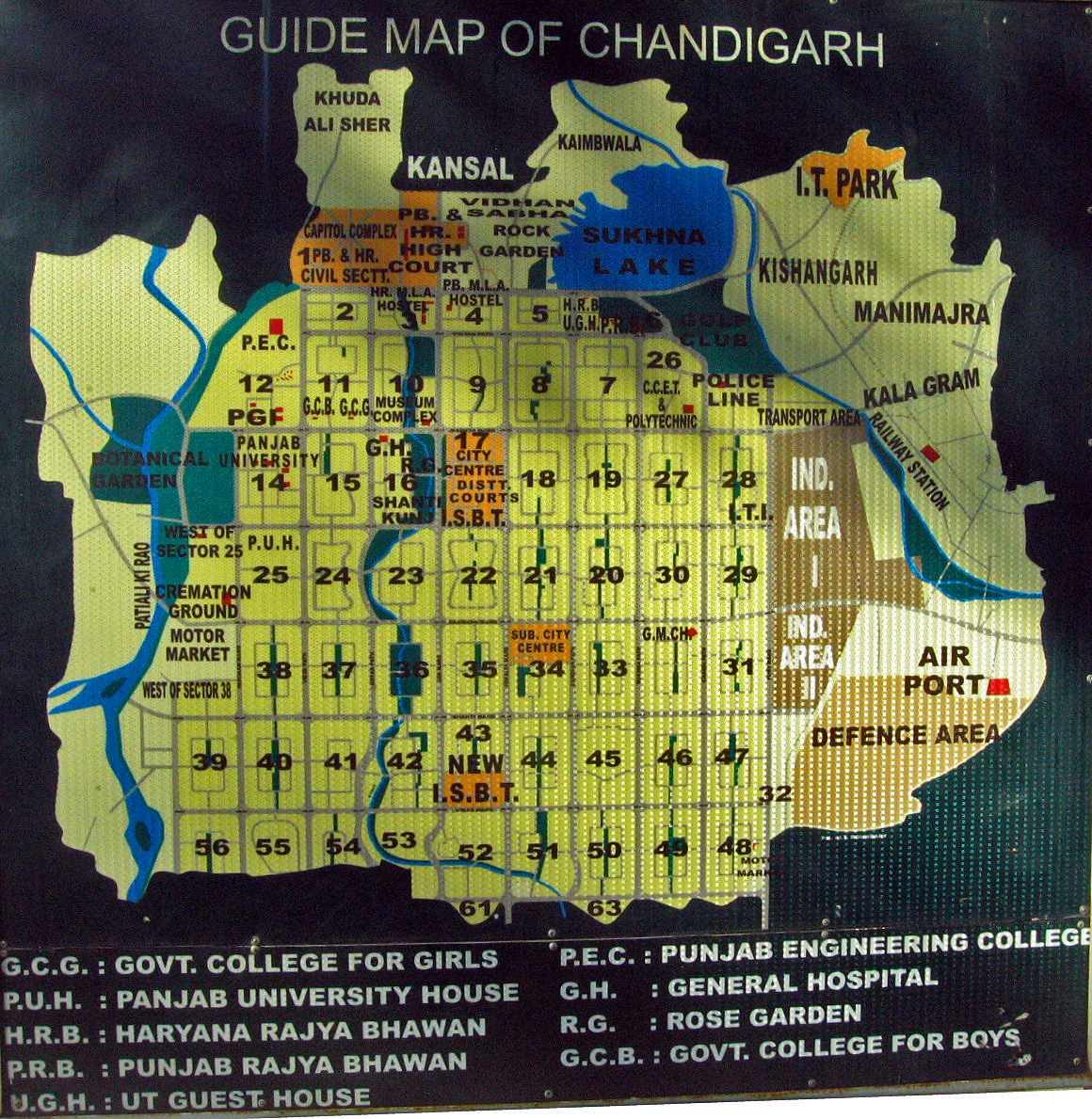
Chandigarh, urban plan and government buildings by Le Corbusier, 1951–1964

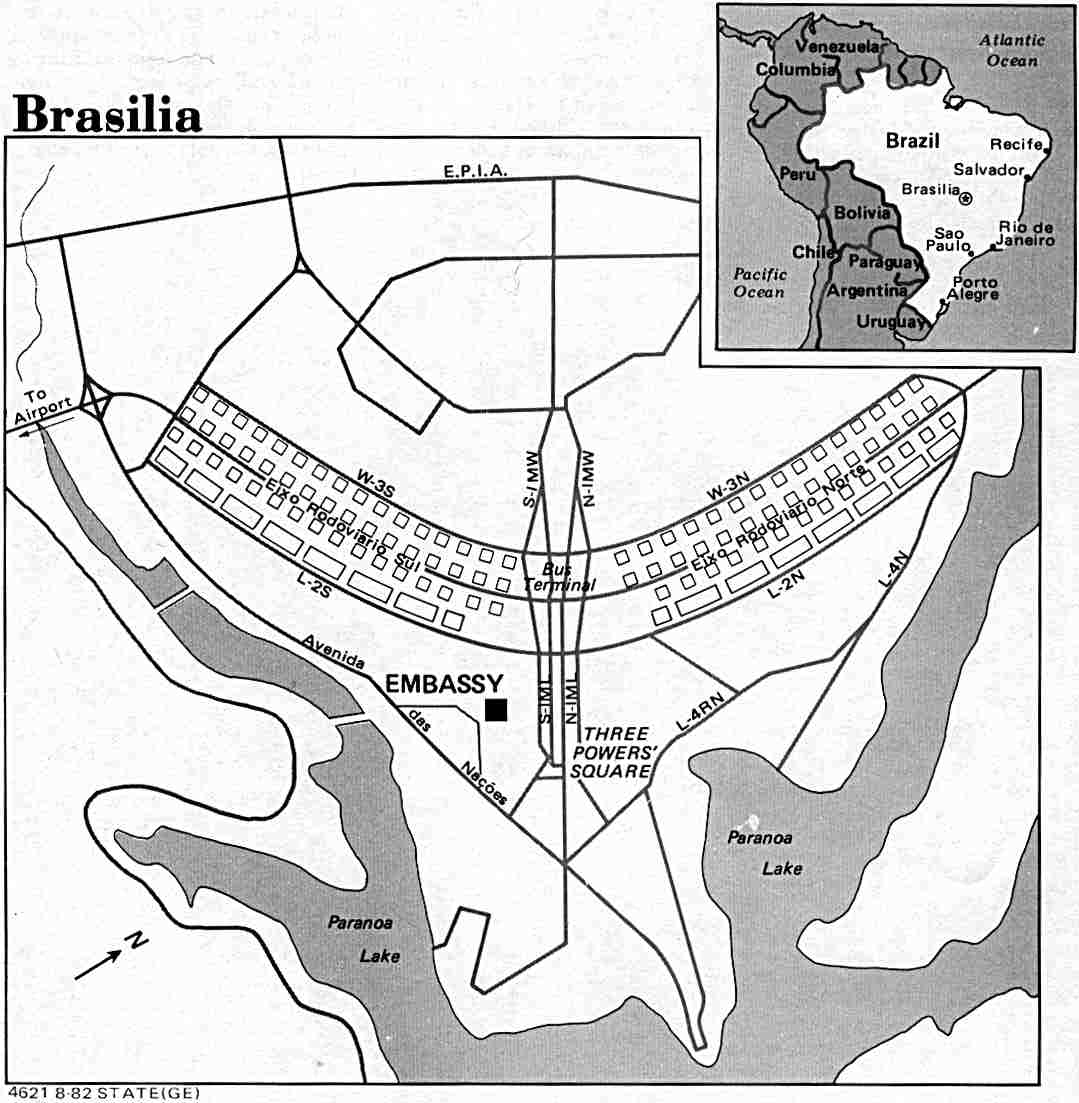
Brasília, urban plan by Lucio Costa, government buildings by Oscar Niemeyer, 1956–1963

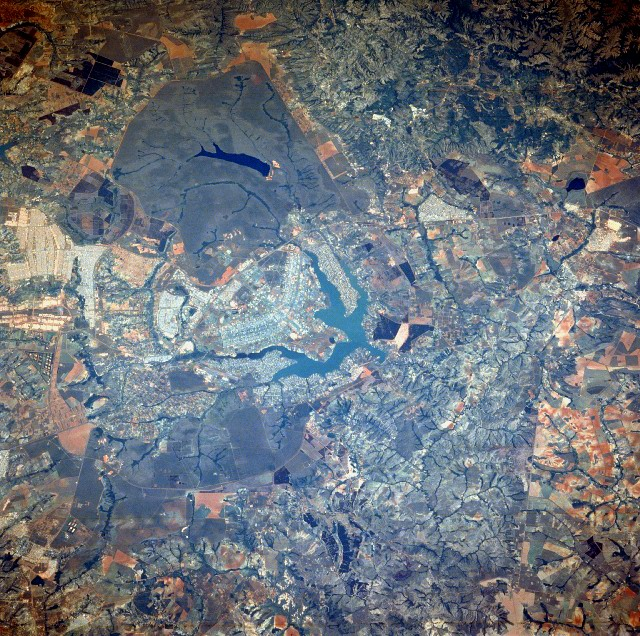
Brasília 1990

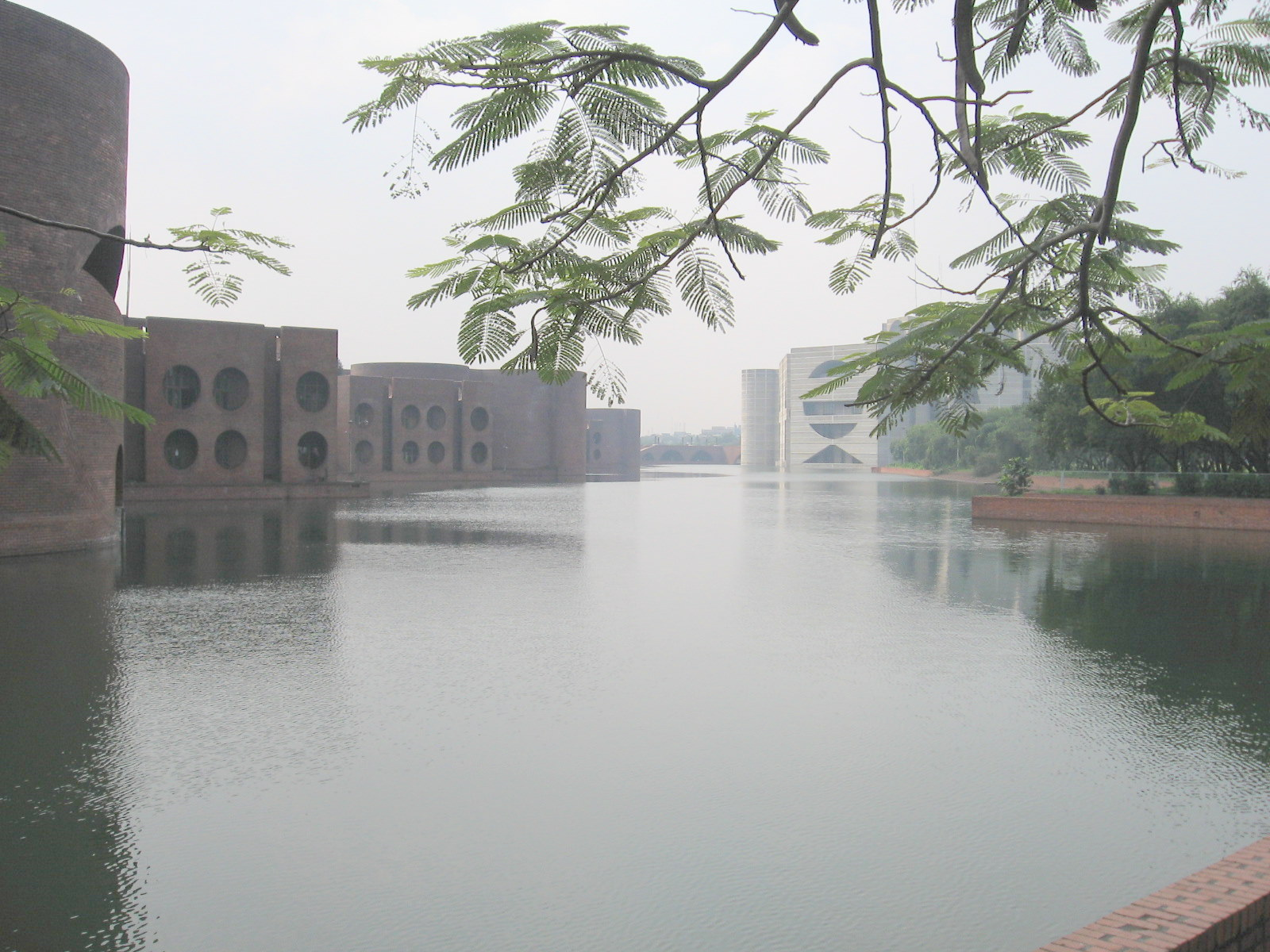
Dhaka, National Parlia- ment Bangladesh, urban plan and architecture by Louis Kahn, 1962–1976

=== Residential areas, large and small scale ===
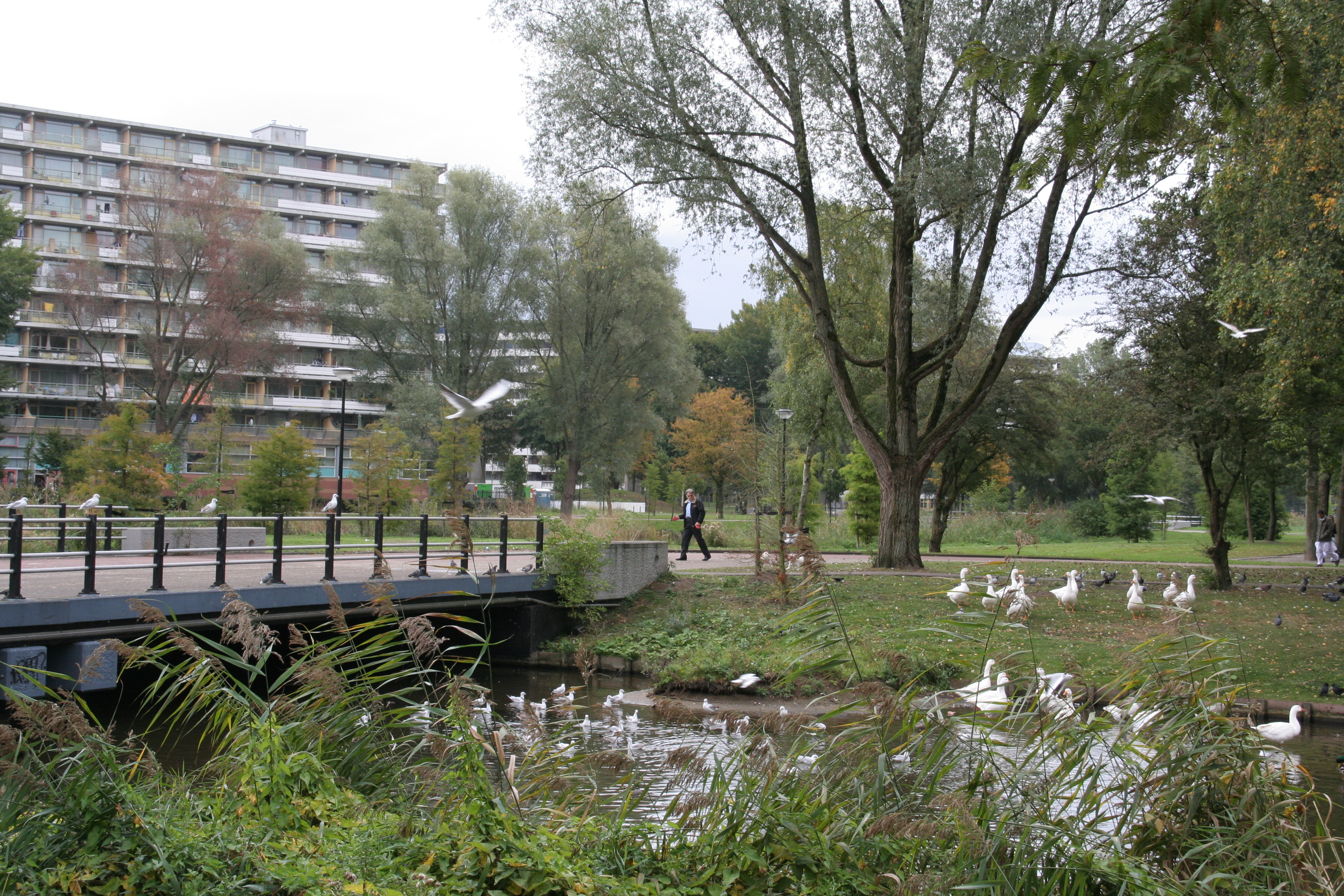
Bijlmermeer in Amsterdam-Zuidoost, 1966–75

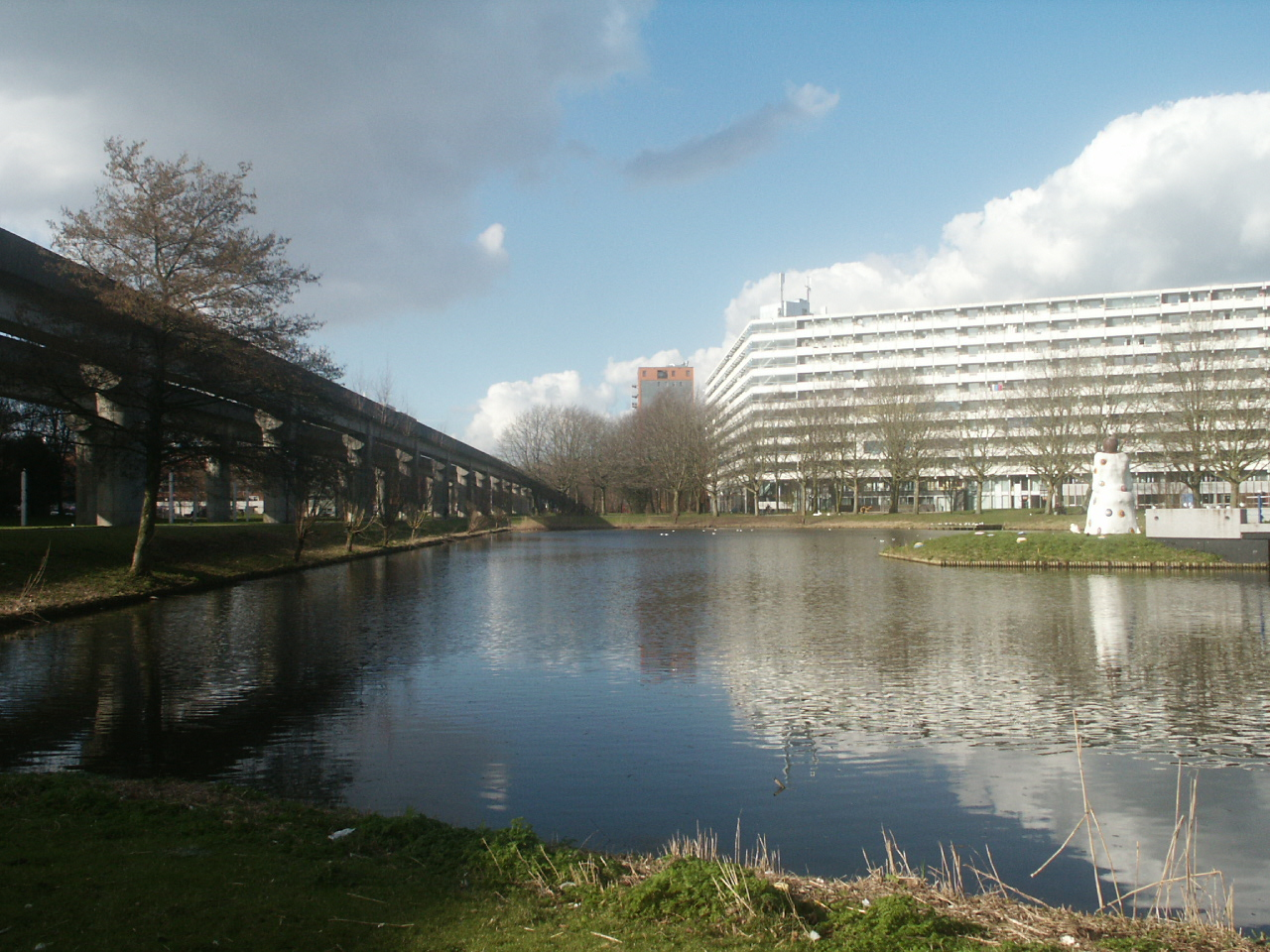
Bijlmermeer metro

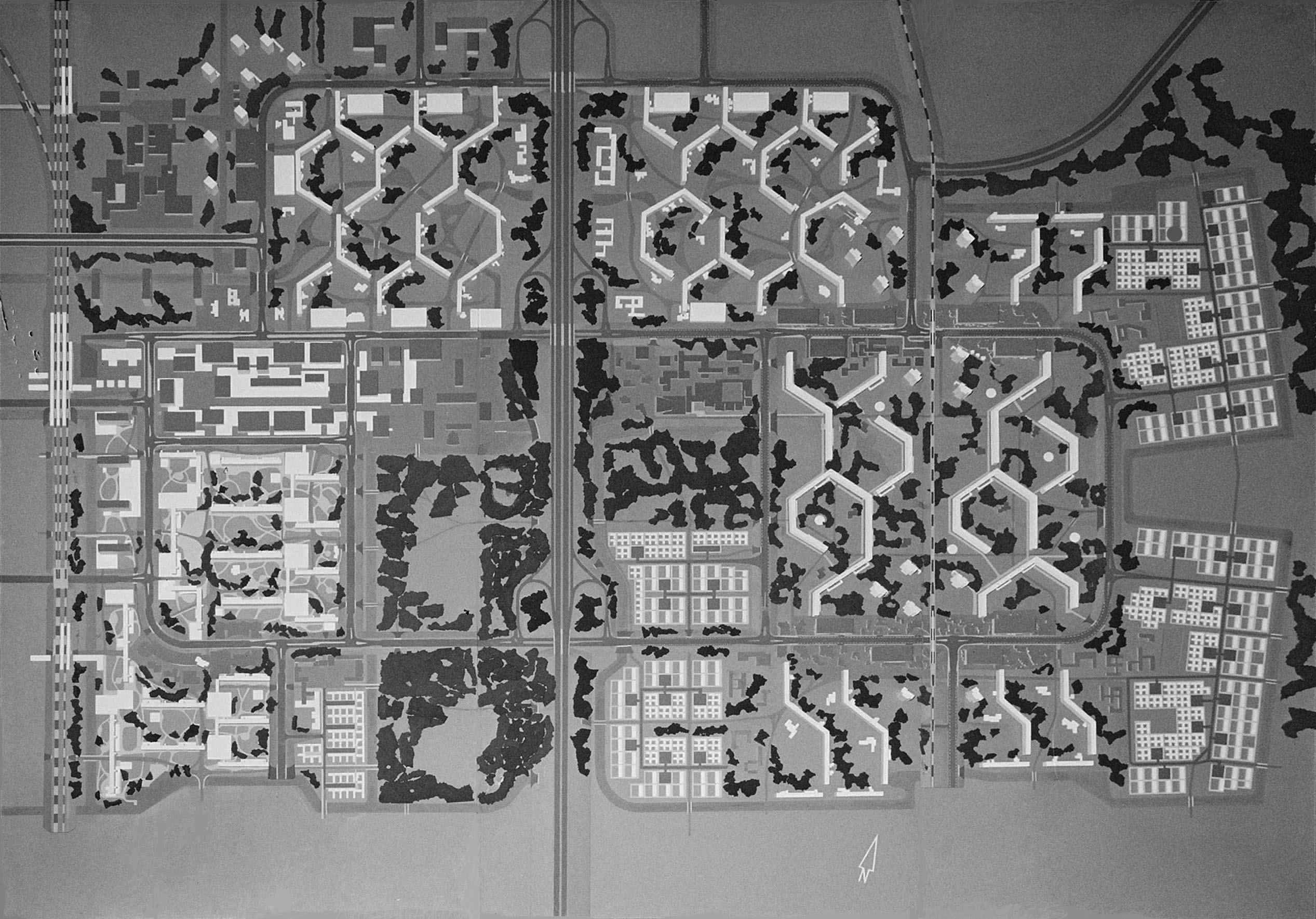
Bijlmermeer, masterplan 1965 (Siegfried Nassuth)

Bijlmermeer 2012, existing buildings (red), demolished (grey)

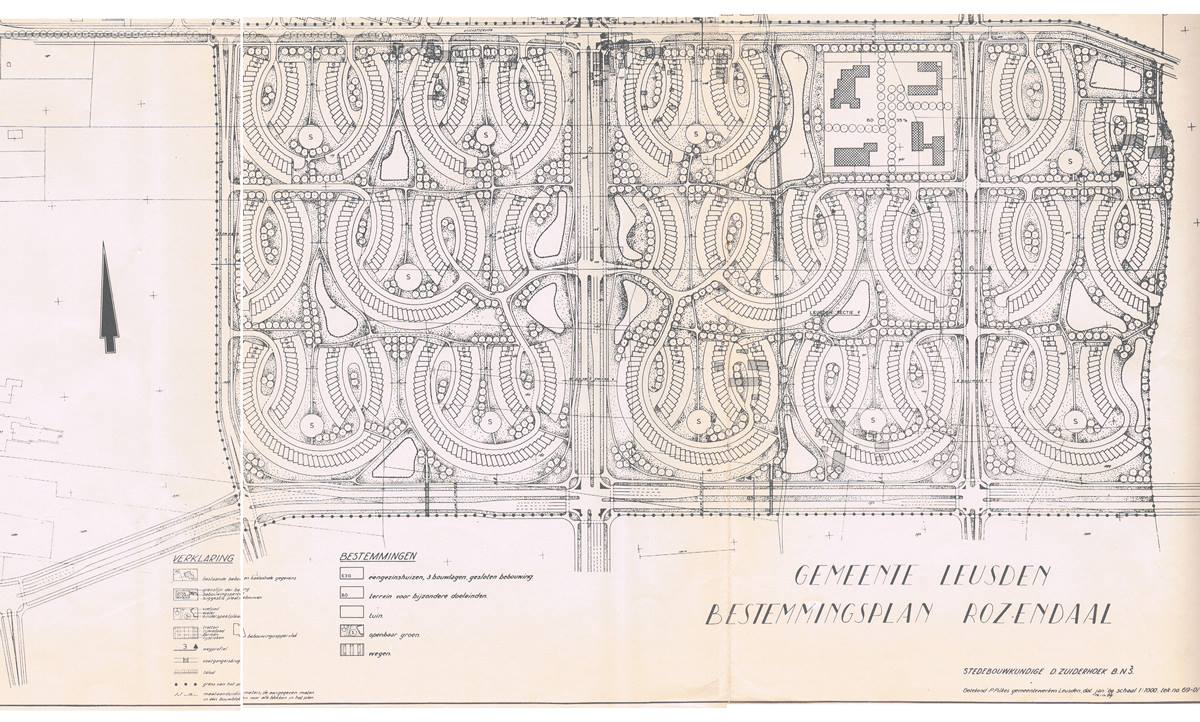
Rozendaal in Leusden, masterplan 1969 (David Zuiderhoek)

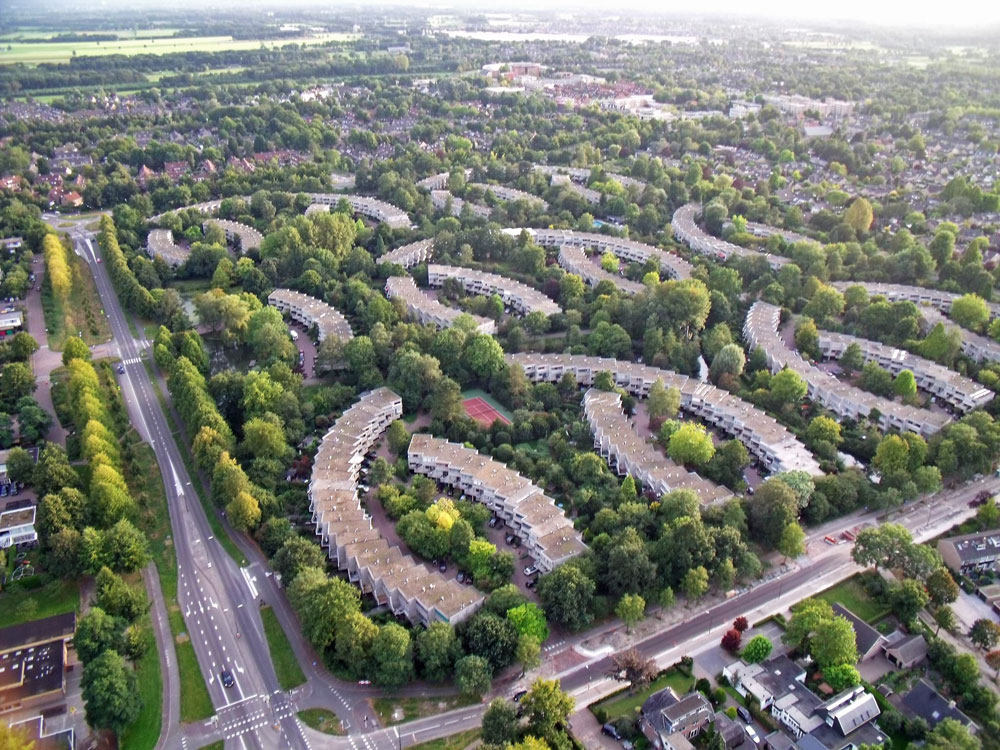
Rozendaal 1973, left part of plan realized (Henk Klunder)

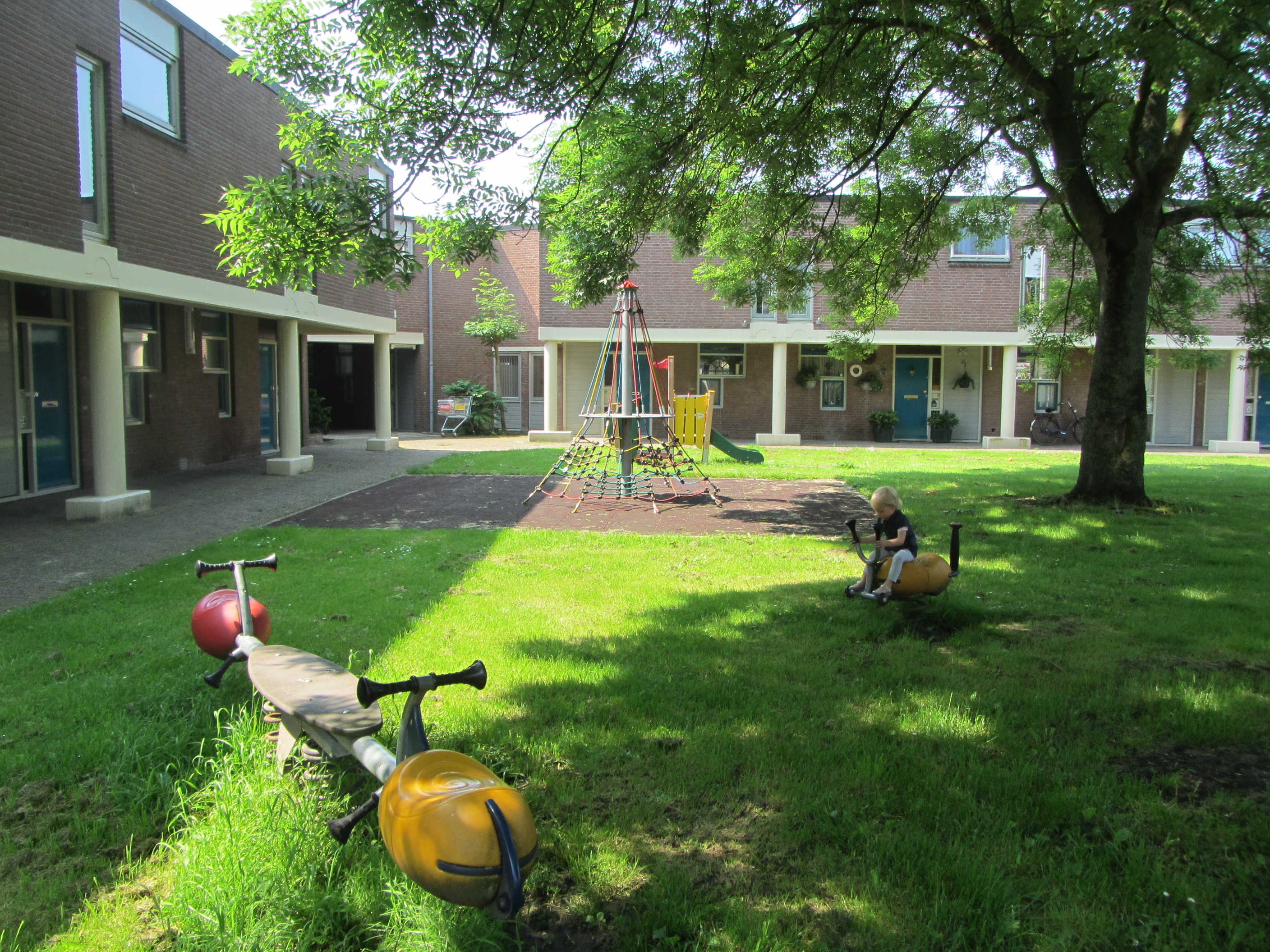
Sterrenwijk in Berkel en Rodenrijs, 1973 (Verhoeven Klunder Witstok Brinkman)

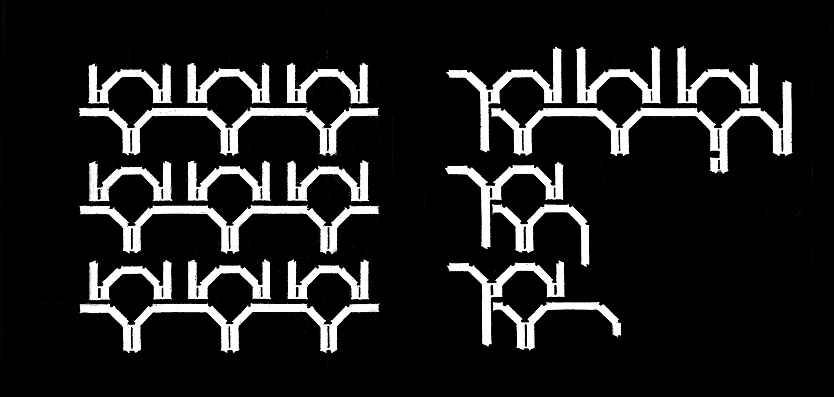
Sterrenwijk, basic structure and realization (see Google Maps, Berkel en Rodenrijs Planetenweg)

== Themes of Team 10 ==
In 1957, Jacob Bakema and members of a re-organisation committee of CIAM called for the alteration of the name "CIAM: Congrès Internationaux d'Architecture Moderne" to "CIAM: Groupe de Recherches des Interrelations Sociales et Plastiques". Two years later, the themes for the new "Working group for the investigation of interrelationships between social and built structures" were published in the magazine Forum 7/1959. This magazine was also the program for the congress CIAM '59 in Otterlo.

Themes of Team 10 on the cover of Forum 7/1959:

- cluster
- change and growth
- à mi-chemin ─ (half-way in relation to other cultures)
- imagination versus common-sense
- appreciated unit
- la plus grand realité du seuil ─ (the philosophy of the doorstep)
- l'espace corridor ─ (against the spatial corridor between functionalistic blocks)
- stad als interieur van de gemeenschap ─ (the city as "interior" of the community)
- identity ─ (architecture and residents)
- het ogenblik van core ─ (core of the city)
- hierarchy of human associations
- mobility
- l'habitat pour le plus grand nombre ─ (habitat for the largest section of the population)
- harmony in motion ─ (aesthetics of number)
- aspect of ascending dimensions
- identifying devices
- gedifferentieerde wooneenheid ─ (differentiated dwelling unit)
- visual group

"De Drie Hoven" for elderly people in Amsterdam-Slotervaart, 1974 (Herman Hertzberger)

== See also ==
- Metabolism (architecture)
- Kenzo Tange & Japanese students, The Metabolism manifesto CIAM, Otterlo, the Netherlands, 1959.
- Kiyonori Kikutake, Sky House, Tokyo, Japan, 1958.

== Literature – interpretations since 1958 ==
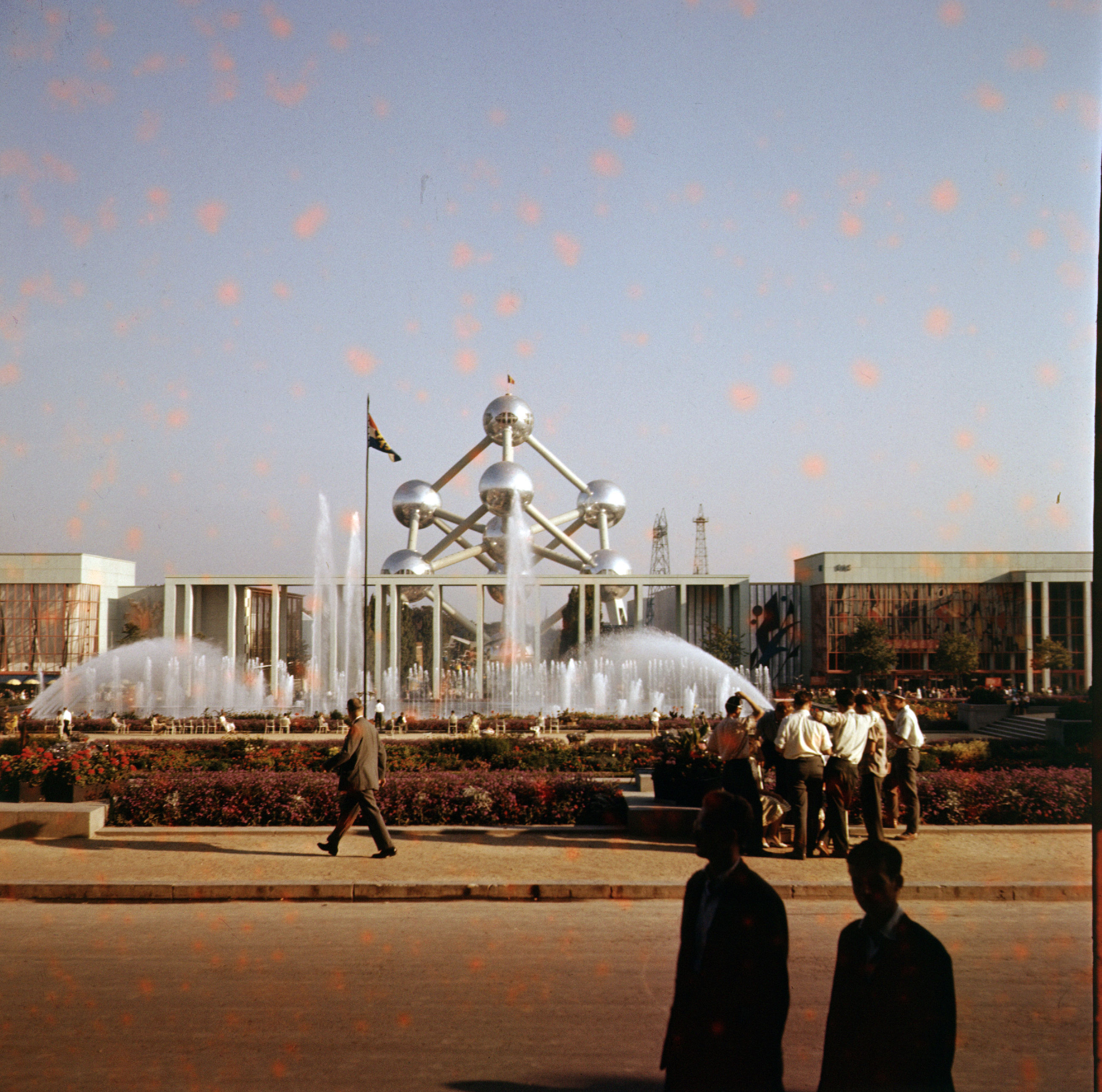
Expo 58 in Brussels. Structuralist pavilions (CH, UK et al.) and Structuralism as a term in architecture magazines, (see Literature)

- Robert von der Nahmer, Space for living - The experimental Diagoon Houses of Herman Hertzberger, Olympos, Delft 2023.
- Lidwine Spoormans et al., The Future of Structuralism, TU Delft Open, Delft 2020.
- Bernhard Denkinger: Die vergessenen Alternativen - Strukturalismus und brutalistische Erfahrung in der Architektur, Berlin 2019.
- Alejandro Aravena and Andrés Iacobelli, Elemental - Incremental Housing and Participatory Design Manual, Berlin 2016.
- Herman Hertzberger, Architecture and Structuralism - The Ordering of Space, Rotterdam 2015 (2014).
- Joaquin Warmburg and Cornelie Leopold (eds.), Strukturelle Architektur, Bielefeld 2012.
- Tomáš Valena, Tom Avermaete, and Georg Vrachliotis (eds.), Structuralism Reloaded - Rule-based Design in Architecture and Urbanism, 47 articles by international authors, Stuttgart-London 2011.
- Rivka Oxman and Robert Oxman (guest-eds.), "The New Structuralism - Design, Engineering and Architectural Technologies", in: Architectural Design July/August 2010, London.
- Mark Garcia (guest-ed.), "Patterns of Architecture", in: Architectural Design November/December 2009, London.
- Sabrina van der Ley and Markus Richter (eds.), Megastructure Reloaded - Visionary Architecture and Urban Design of the Sixties reflected by Contemporary Artists, Ostfildern near Stuttgart 2008. 25 articles about Archigram, Yona Friedman, Eckhard Schulze-Fielitz, Constant et al., (German+English).
- Michael Hecker, Structurel-Structural, Structuralist Theory in Architecture and Urbanism 1959–1975, thesis Stuttgart University of Technology, Stuttgart 2007.
- Max Risselada and Dirk van den Heuvel (eds.), Team 10 - In Search of a Utopia of the Present, essays and interviews by 23 international authors, Rotterdam 2005. Editor Dirk van den Heuvel about structuralism in the Netherlands on page 208: "Structuralism never turned into a real movement or an organized group."
- Francis Strauven, Aldo van Eyck - The Shape of Relativity, Amsterdam 1998 (1994). Biography of Aldo van Eyck and his "Configurative Discipline" of designing.
- Wim van Heuvel, Structuralism in Dutch architecture, Rotterdam 1992.
- Hans van Dijk, "The demise of structuralism", in: Architecture in the Netherlands - Yearbook 1988/1989 - Dutch Architectural Institute Rotterdam, Deventer 1989.
- Anders Ekholm, Nils Ahrbom, Peter Broberg, Poul-Erik Skriver, Strukturalism i Arkitekturen, Stockholm 1980.
- Reyner Banham, Megastructure - Urban Futures of the Recent Past, London 1976.
- Alison Smithson, "Mat-Building, mainstream architecture as it has developed towards the mat-building", in: Architectural Design 9/1974, London.
- Arnulf Lüchinger, "Strukturalismus", in: Bauen+Wohnen 5/1974, Zurich-Munich. – "Structuralism, a new trend in architecture", in: Bauen+Wohnen 1/1976, Zurich-Munich (guest-editor for this special issue). – "Dutch Structuralism", in: Architecture+Urbanism 3/1977, Tokyo. – Structuralism in Architecture and Urban Planning, Stuttgart 1980. – 2-Komponenten-Bauweise, The Hague 2000 (participation).
- Justus Dahinden, Stadtstrukturen für morgen (Urban Structures for the Future), Stuttgart 1971, London-New York 1972.
- Udo Kultermann, "Introduction", in: Kenzo Tange, Zurich 1970. The term "Structurism" is mentioned by Udo Kultermann as one of the themes, "characterizing the present phase in architecture".
- Arnaud Beerends, "Een Structuur voor het Raadhuis van Amsterdam" (A Structure for the Town Hall in Amsterdam), in: TABK 1/1969, Heerlen. In the Netherlands the architectural terms "Structuralism" and "Structuralists" are published the first time in this magazine, according to the "Configurative Discipline" with equal building units.
- Kenzo Tange, "Function, Structure and Symbol, 1966", in: Udo Kultermann, Kenzo Tange, Zurich 1970. Process of structuring in urban design. Kenzo Tange in a lecture in 1981: "It was, I believe, around 1959 or in the beginning of the Sixties, that I started to think about what I was later to call structuralism," (in: Plan 2/1982, Amsterdam).
- Félix Candela, "Architecture et 'structuralisme' ", in: habitation 3/1964, Lausanne, pp. 44–50, without illustrations, (see External link ETH). In 1960 Candela built the structuralist Bacardi-Factory in Cuautitlán near Mexico-City.
- N. John Habraken, Supports - An Alternative to Mass Housing. Participation in housing, structure and infill. Editions in Dutch 1961, English 1972, Italian 1974, Spanish 1975 and German 2000 (with illustrations). The third edition of Supports is published 2021 in the series "Routledge Revivals".
- Oscar Newman (ed.), CIAM '59 in Otterlo, Stuttgart-London-New York 1961. 30 articles by Louis Kahn, Kenzo Tange, Georges Candilis, Jacob Bakema, Aldo van Eyck, Alison and Peter Smithson et al. (English+German supplement).
- Aldo van Eyck, "Het Verhaal van een Andere Gedachte" (The Story of Another Idea), in: Forum 7/1959, Amsterdam-Hilversum. Program for the congress CIAM '59 in Otterlo, without using the term structuralism. Since the 1970s the Otterlo congress is considered the official start of the international structuralist movement.
- Ernesto Nathan Rogers and Pier Luigi Nervi, "Architettura e strutturalismo", in: Casabella 7/1959, Milano, pp. 4−5. Two months later Ernesto Rogers was participant of the Otterlo congress. He was related to Richard Rogers, who designed the Centre Pompidou in Paris in partnership with Renzo Piano.
- Giuseppe Vindigni, "Rundgang durch die Expo 1958" (Walking through the Expo 1958 in Brussels), in: Bauen+Wohnen 9/1958, Zurich, pp. 243–244, without illustrations. The US-Pavilion is described as 'Structuralism' and the Swiss Pavilion like a 'honeycomb'. Today the Swiss Pavilion by Werner Gantenbein is seen as an important early work of structuralism, (see External link ETH).
