= Scheepstimmermanstraat =

Street in Amsterdam, the Netherlands

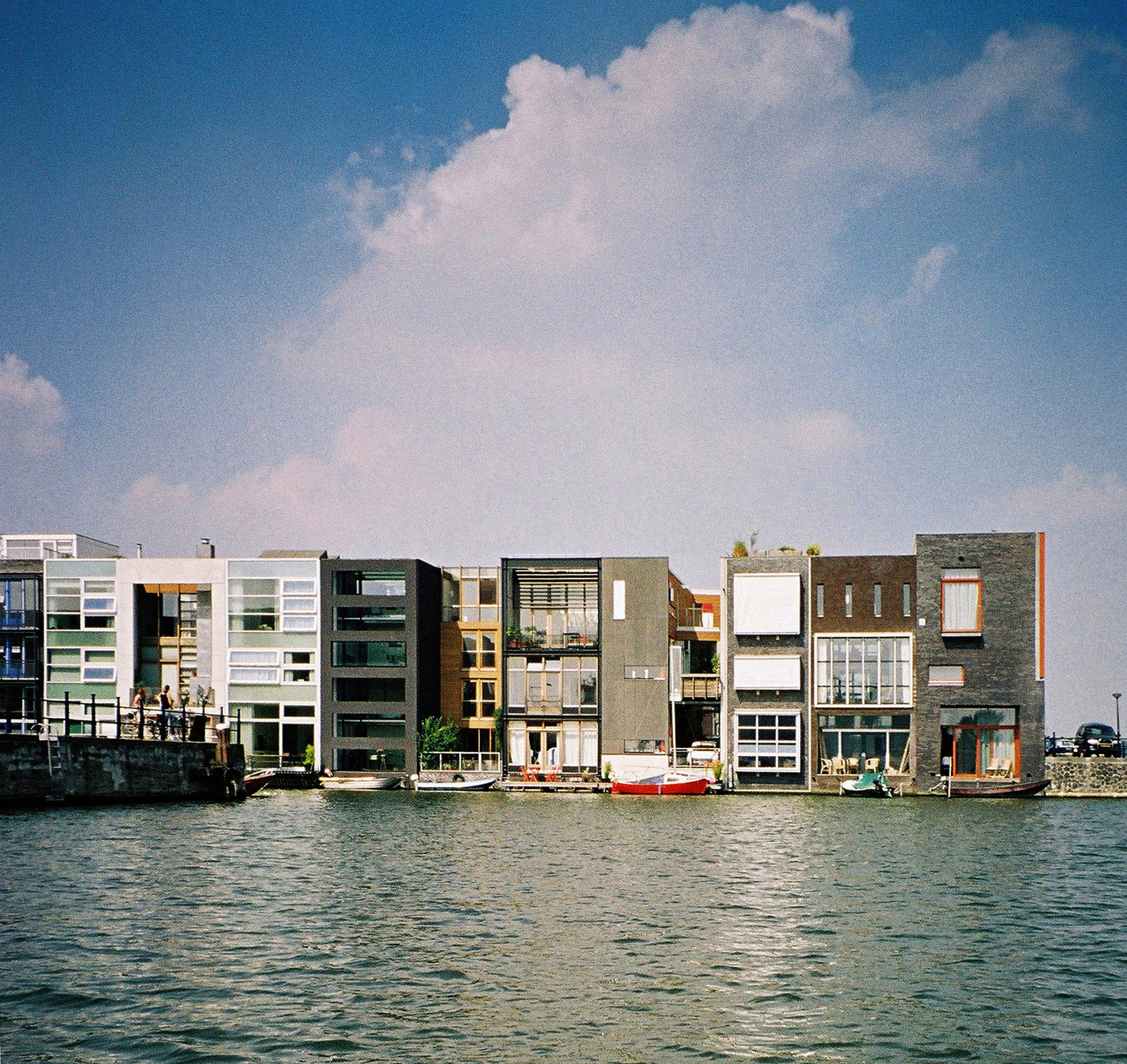
Scheepstimmermanstraat Amsterdam waterside, construction 1997. Free choice of style and architect (participation), coordination Adriaan Geuze.

The Scheepstimmermanstraat (Shipwright's Street) in Amsterdam is well known for its 60 unique houses designed by architects such as Hertzberger (no.126), van Velsen (no.120), Höhne & Rapp (no.62) and MVRDV (no.26 & 40).

The landscape architect Adriaan Geuze of the firm West 8 planned a district with one of the streets on which residents were free to design their own houses on the waterfront.

The Scheepstimmermanstraat is an example of user participation in housing. The theory of this movement is introduced in 1961 by John Habraken. It is a partial aspect of Structuralism.
