= N. John Habraken =

Dutch architect (1928–2023)

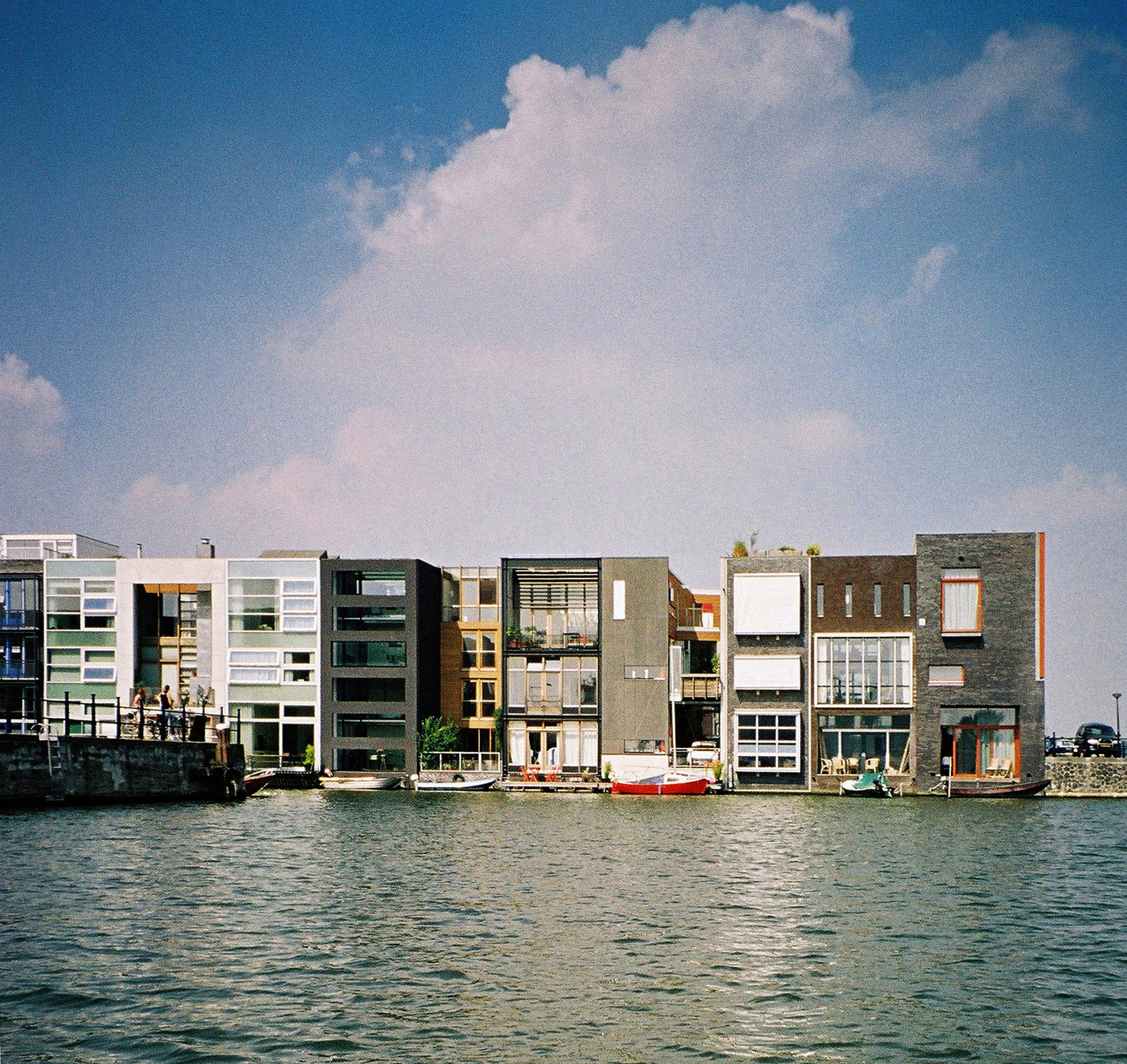
1997, Amsterdam Scheepstimmermanstraat, "Cubist style". Master plan and coordination West 8 (Adriaan Geuze), design of houses by different architects with individual clients

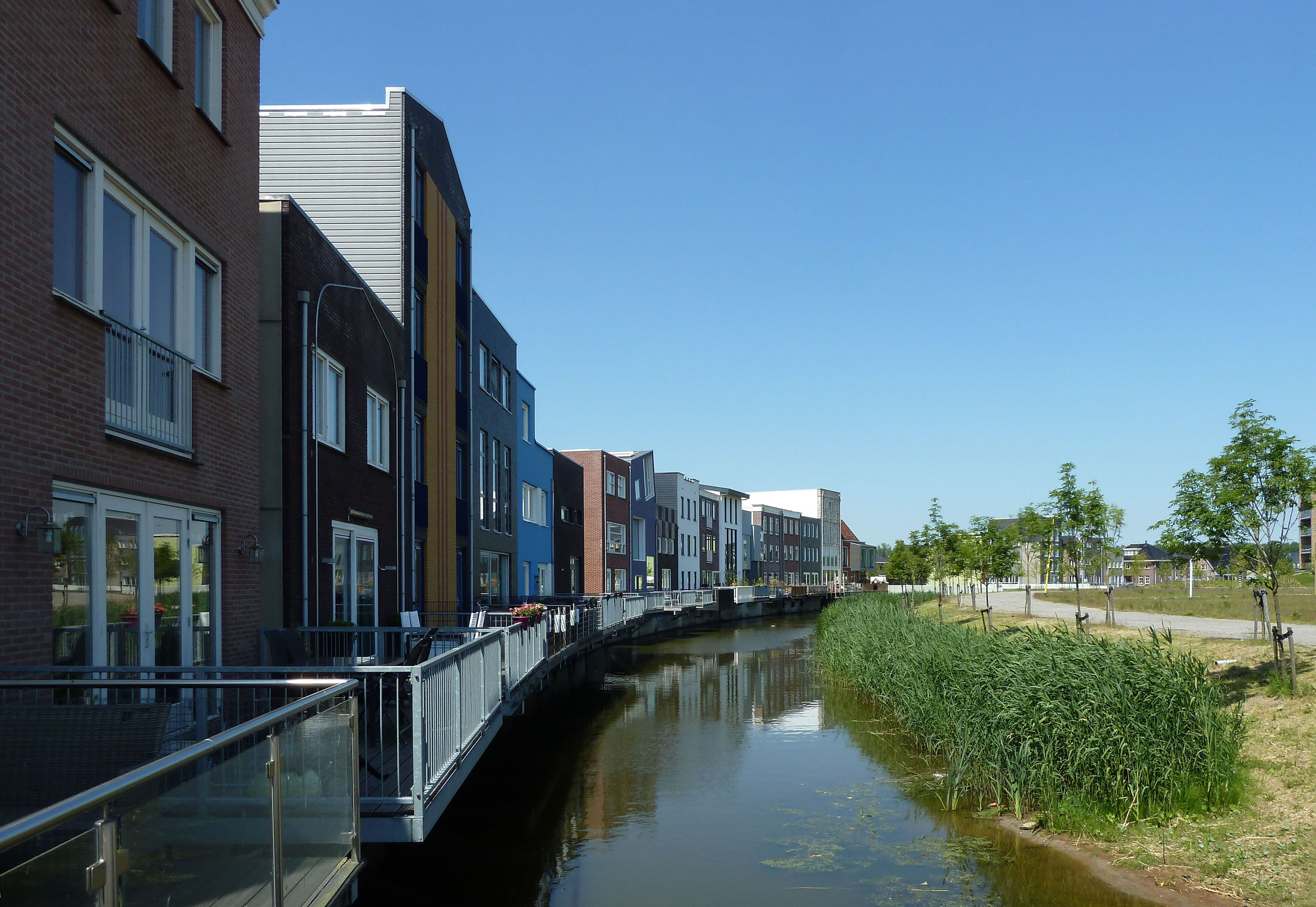
2012, Almere Homeruskwartier, "Mix of styles". Master plan and coordination OMA, design of houses by different architects and residents. Further illustrations see below

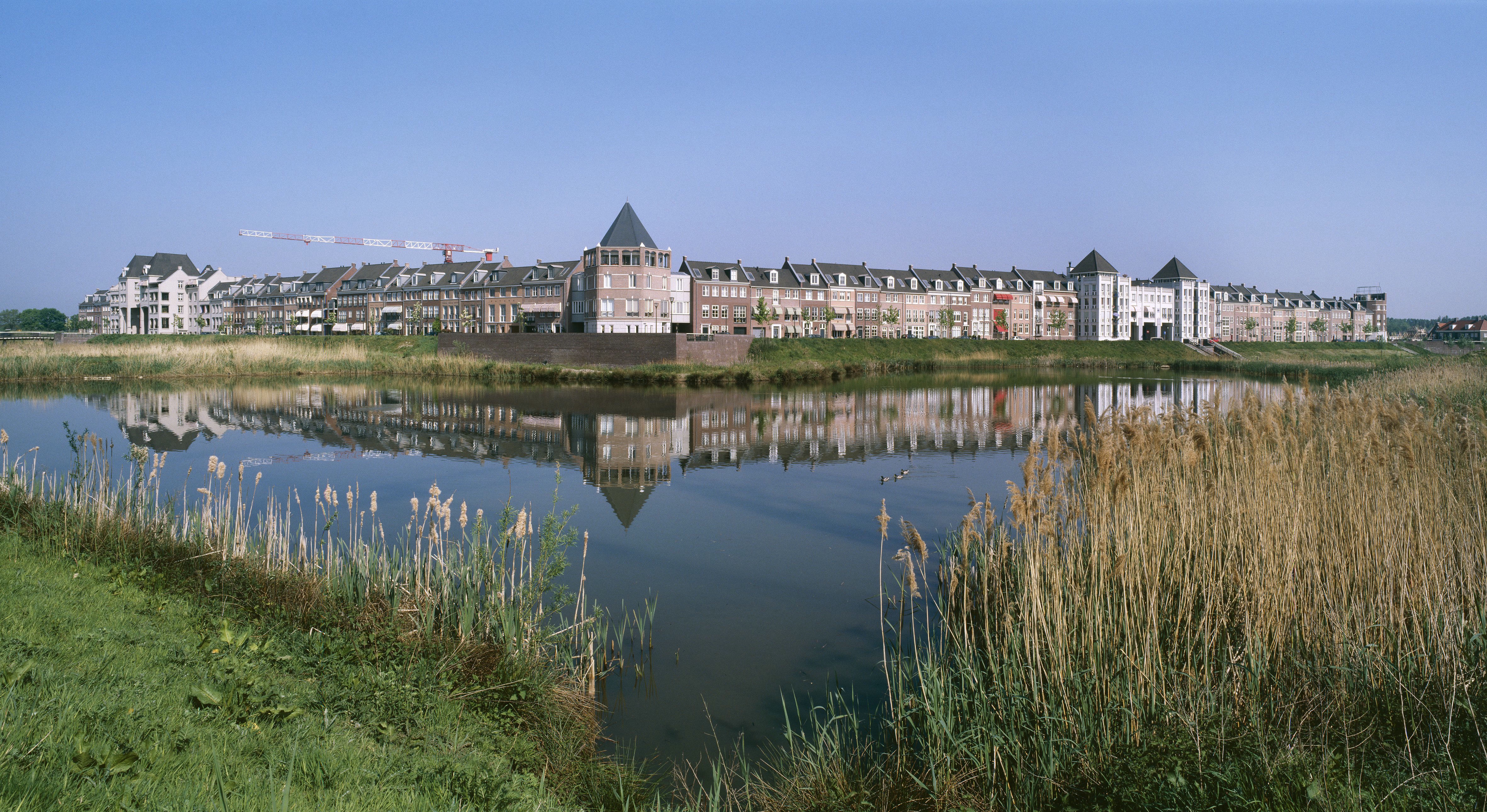
2005, Helmond Brandevoort, "Traditionalist style". Master plan and coordination Rob Krier, design of houses by different architects with individual clients

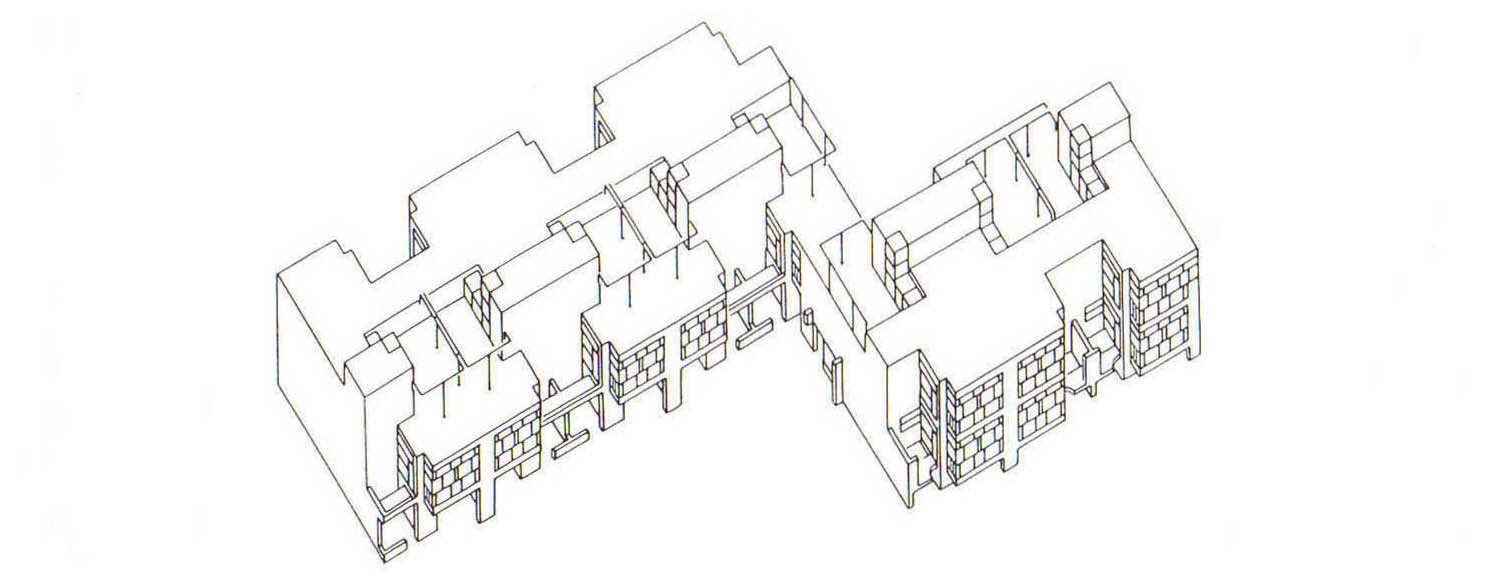
1971, Delft Diagoon housing, "Architecture as a half-product". Development plan and architecture by Herman Hertzberger. Basic structure for participation

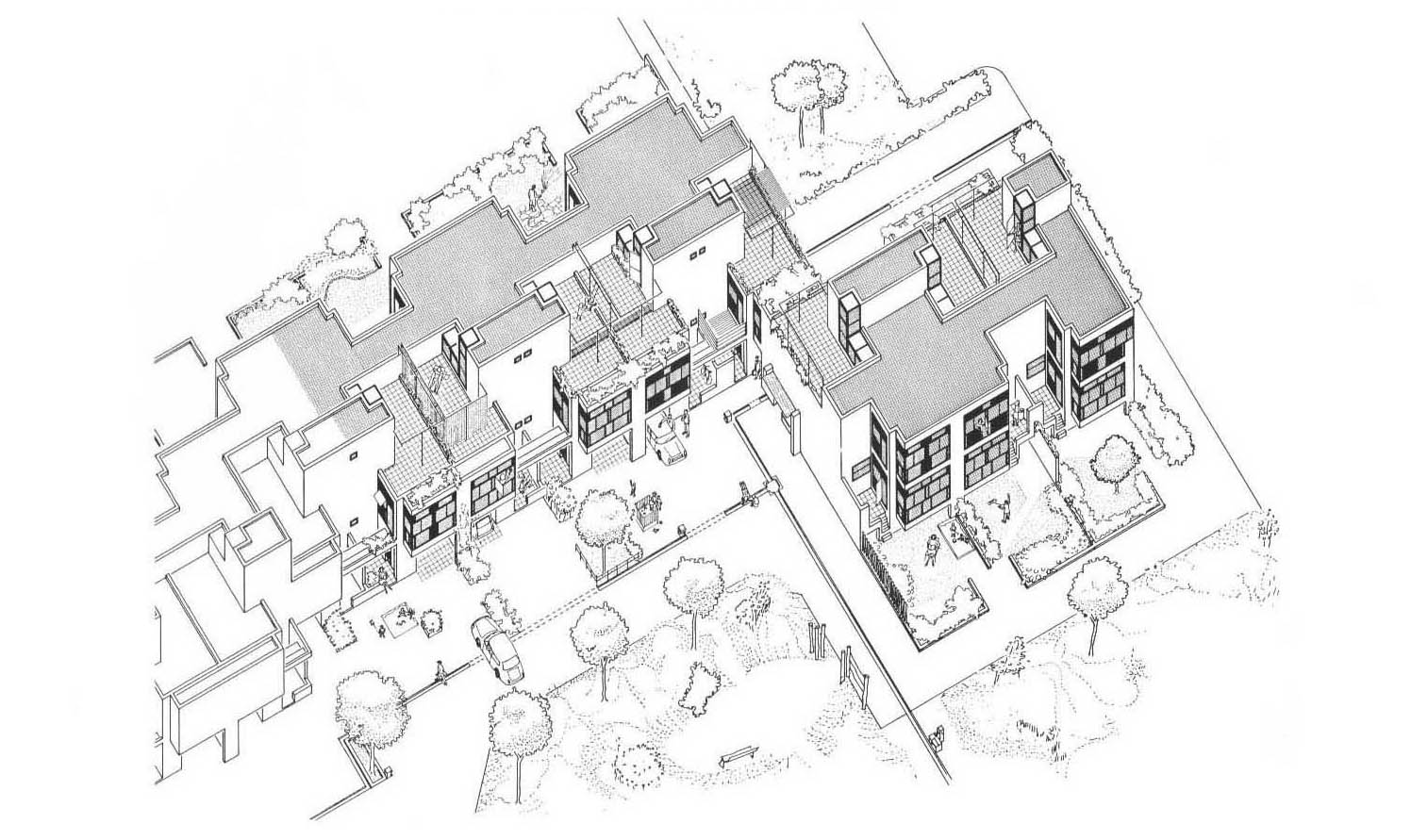
Delft Diagoon housing. Participation of the residents: interior, exterior and landscaping

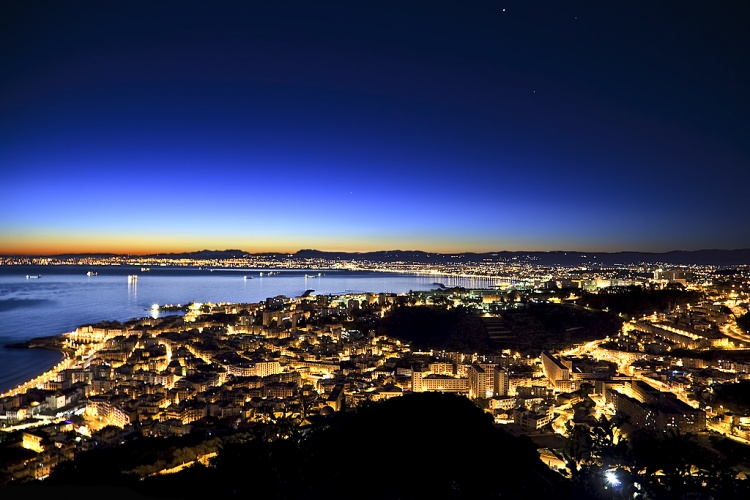
In 1933 Le Corbusier designed the project "Fort l'Empereur" in Algiers, a housing estate with participation of the residents. The project is relevant again in the magazine Forum 2/1962 by Bakema.

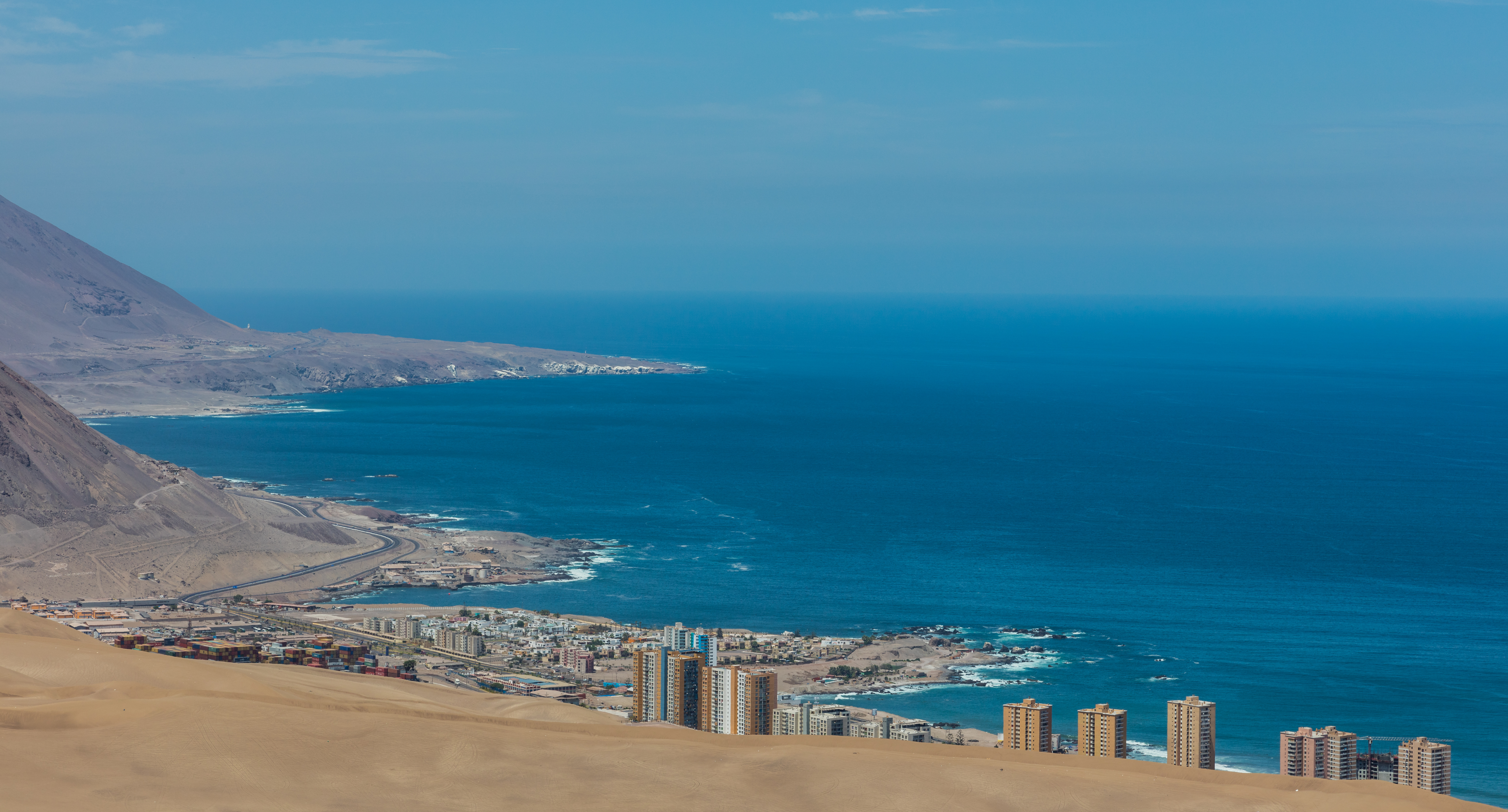
Social housing estates with half-houses for participation in: Iquique 2004 (ill.), Santiago 2007, Monterrey 2010, Constitución 2016 (Alejandro Aravena)

N. John Habraken (29 October 1928 – 21 October 2023) was a Dutch architect, educator, and theorist. His theoretical contributions are in the field of user participation in mass housing, the integration of users and residents into the design process. The visual result of his theory is the architecture of lively variety. Habraken was the initiator of the international "Participation movement" in architecture. His book Supports: An Alternative to Mass Housing, first published in 1961, is the manifesto and starting point of this movement. The theme resident or user participation has been linked to Structuralism and open building.

== Biography ==
N. John Habraken was born on 29 October 1928 in Bandung, Dutch East Indies. He studied architecture at Delft Technical University, the Netherlands from 1948 to 1955. From 1965 to 1975, he was the founding director of Stichting Architecten Research (Foundation for Architects Research) (SAR) in the Netherlands, researching and developing methods for the design and construction of adaptable housing. In his seminal book, Supports, Habraken proposes the separation of supports or base buildings from "Infills" in residential construction and design as a means of giving inhabitants a meaningful participative role in the design process. According to Habraken, the implementation of his theory into practice is left to the decision of "the architects".

In 1967 Habraken was appointed professor at Eindhoven University of Technology, and charged with the responsibility to set up its new Department of Architecture and serve as its first chairperson. From 1975 to 1981 Habraken served as head of the Department of Architecture at the Massachusetts Institute of Technology (MIT), Cambridge, MA. He taught at MIT until his retirement as professor emeritus in 1989.

Habraken remained occupied with methods and theory of architectural and urban design. He lectured on these topics worldwide and is the author of a vast number of books, research reports, and many articles. His book The Structure of the Ordinary is an investigation of laws governing the built environment as revealed by patterns of transformation. His last book, Palladio’s Children is an attempt to explain why architects do not know how to deal with everyday environment.

Habraken lived in Apeldoorn, the Netherlands. He died on 21 October 2023, at the age of 94.

== Awards and honors ==
Habraken was recipient of the 1988 Creative Achievement Award of the Association of Collegiate Schools in the US; the David Roëll prize 1979 of the Dutch Prince Bernhard Fund; the King Fahd award for design and research in Islamic Architecture, 1985–86; and the Oeuvre Award for 1996 of the National Foundation for Art, design, and Architecture (BKVB oeuvre prijs) in the Netherlands. He was an honorary member of the Architectural Institute of Japan, Knight of the Royal Order of the Dutch Lion 2003, and recipient of the 2003 Kubus Award for Advancing the Standing of Architecture, by the BNA, Dutch Association of Architects.

== Urban ensembles – possibilities and limitations ==
2012, Almere housing estate Homeruskwartier, "Mix of styles", master plan and coordination by OMA. The houses are designed by various architects and residents. Because the Homeruskwartier has very different architectural styles and building ensembles, it could be interesting for the discussion about "Possibilities and Limitations", see References below. In the map Almere, the participatory project is on the left side, a circular plan. (Homeruskwartier: 0,1 from left / 0,7 from above)

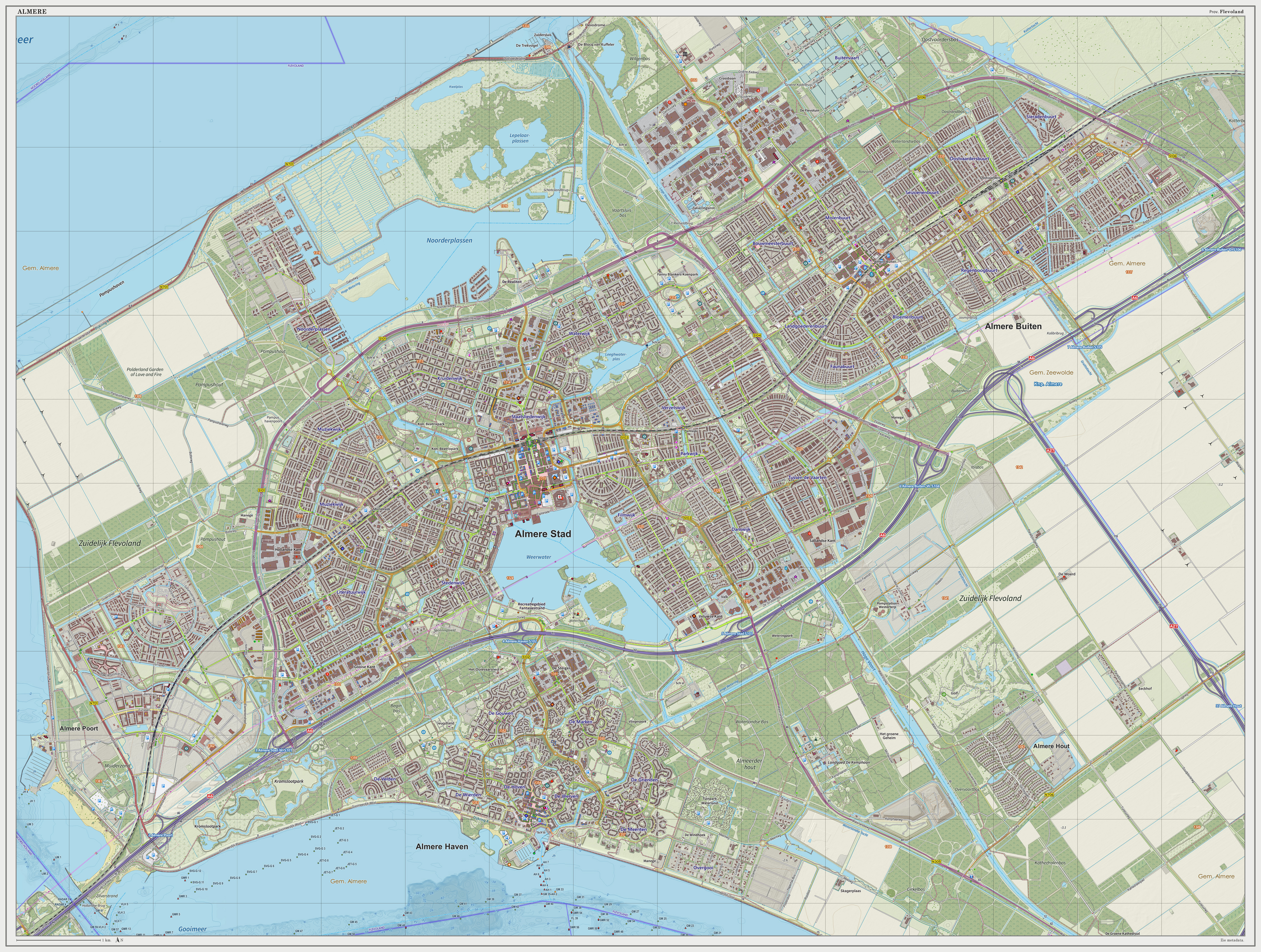
Almere

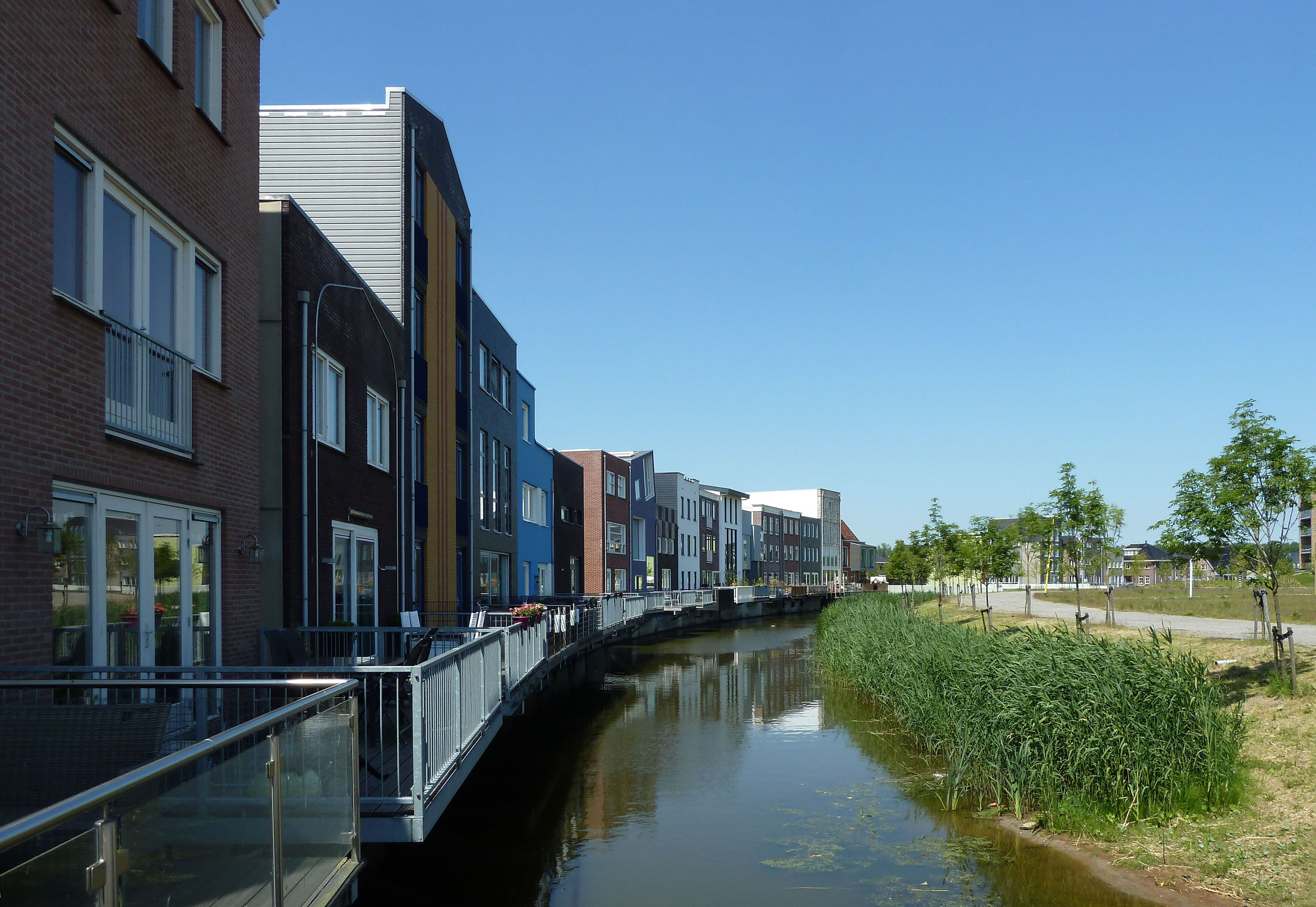
Aresstraat

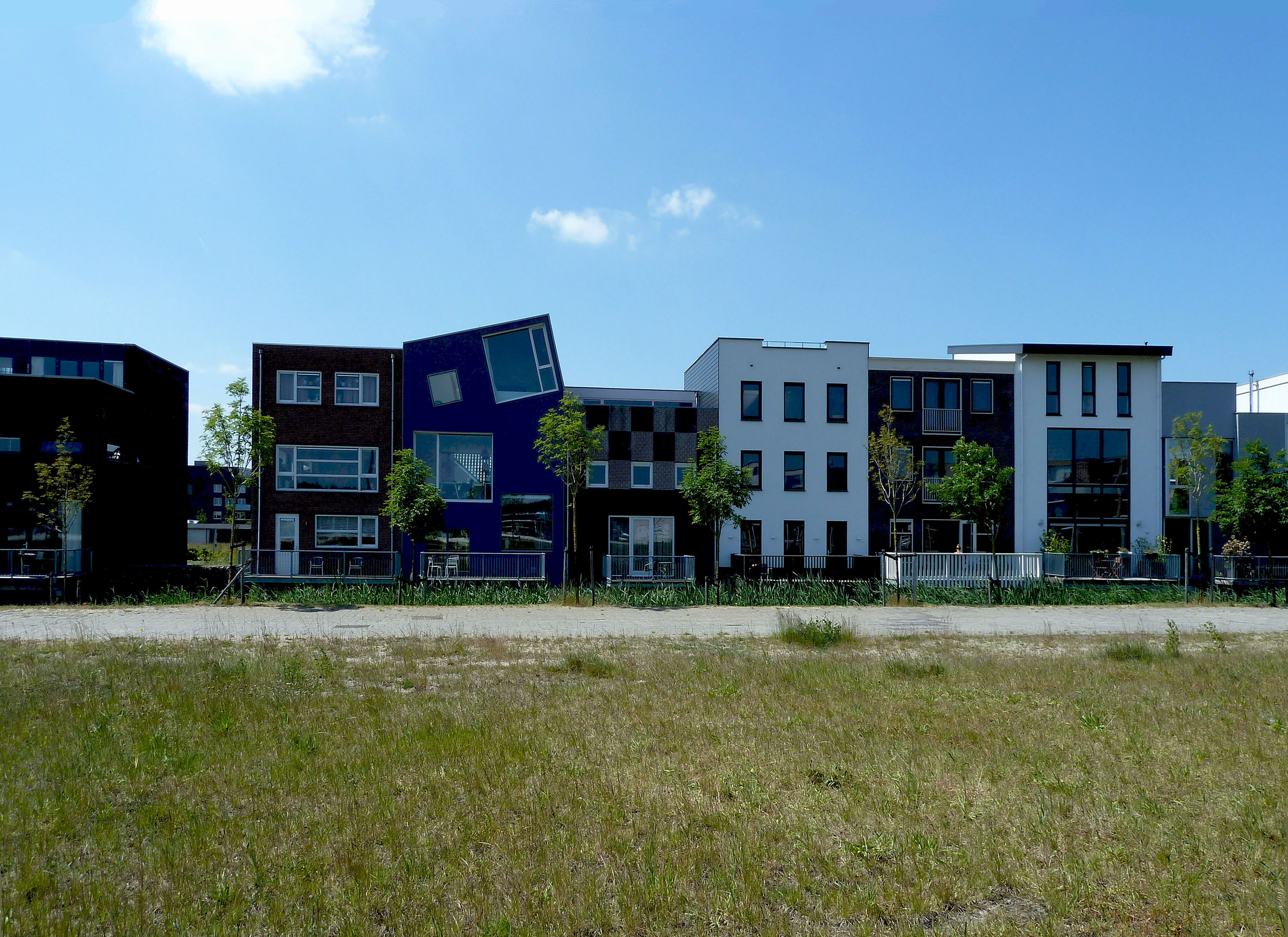

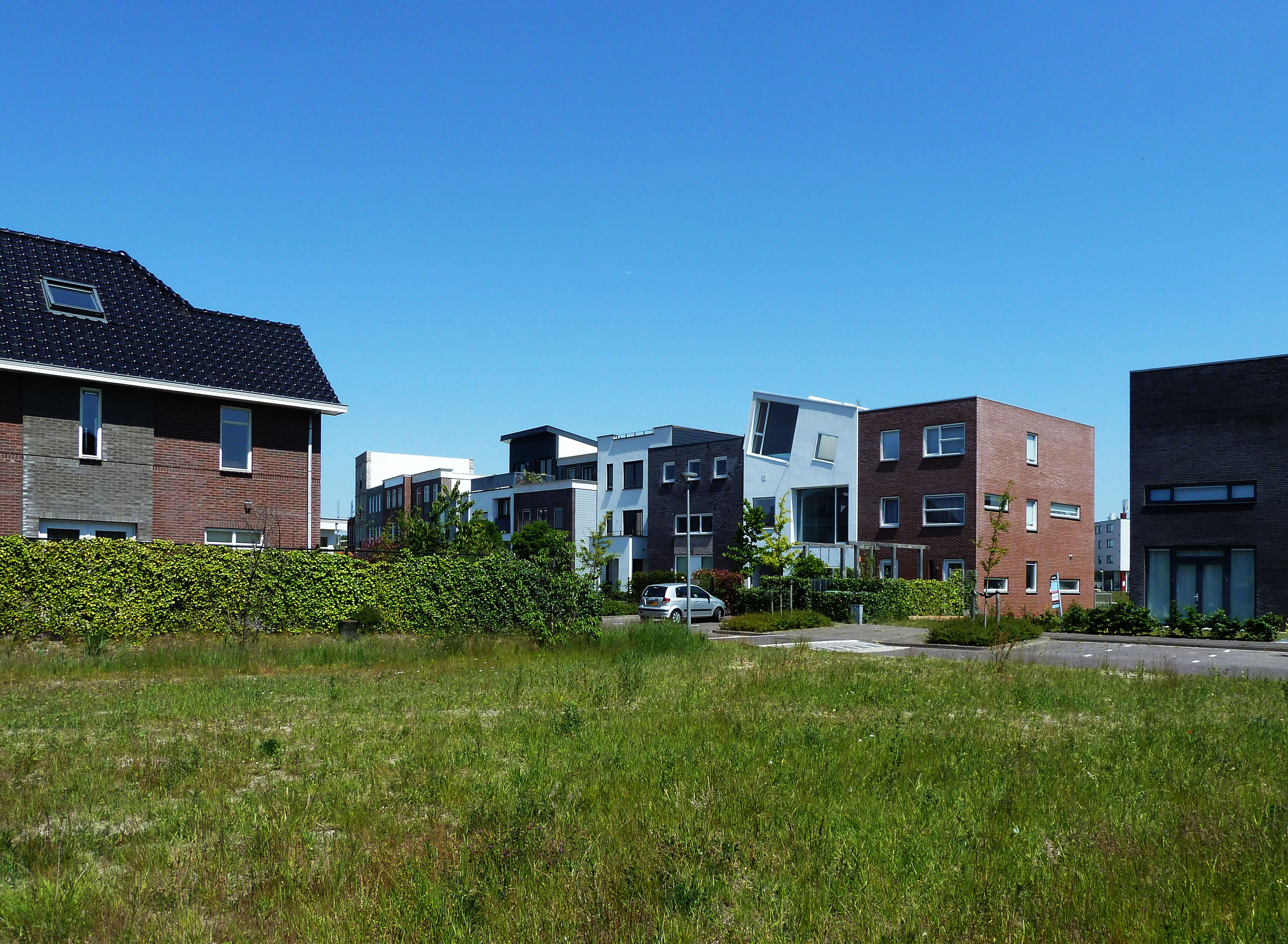

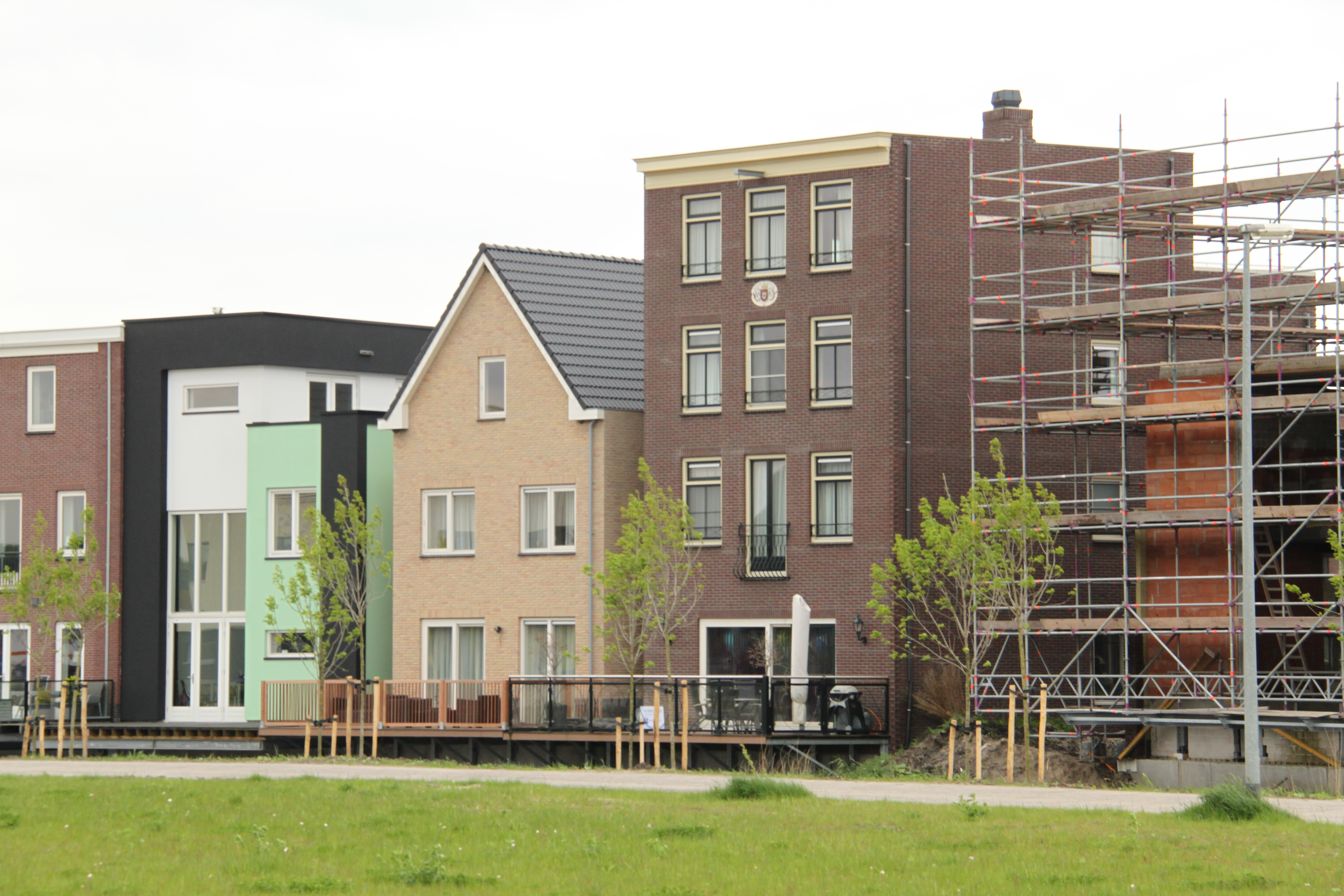

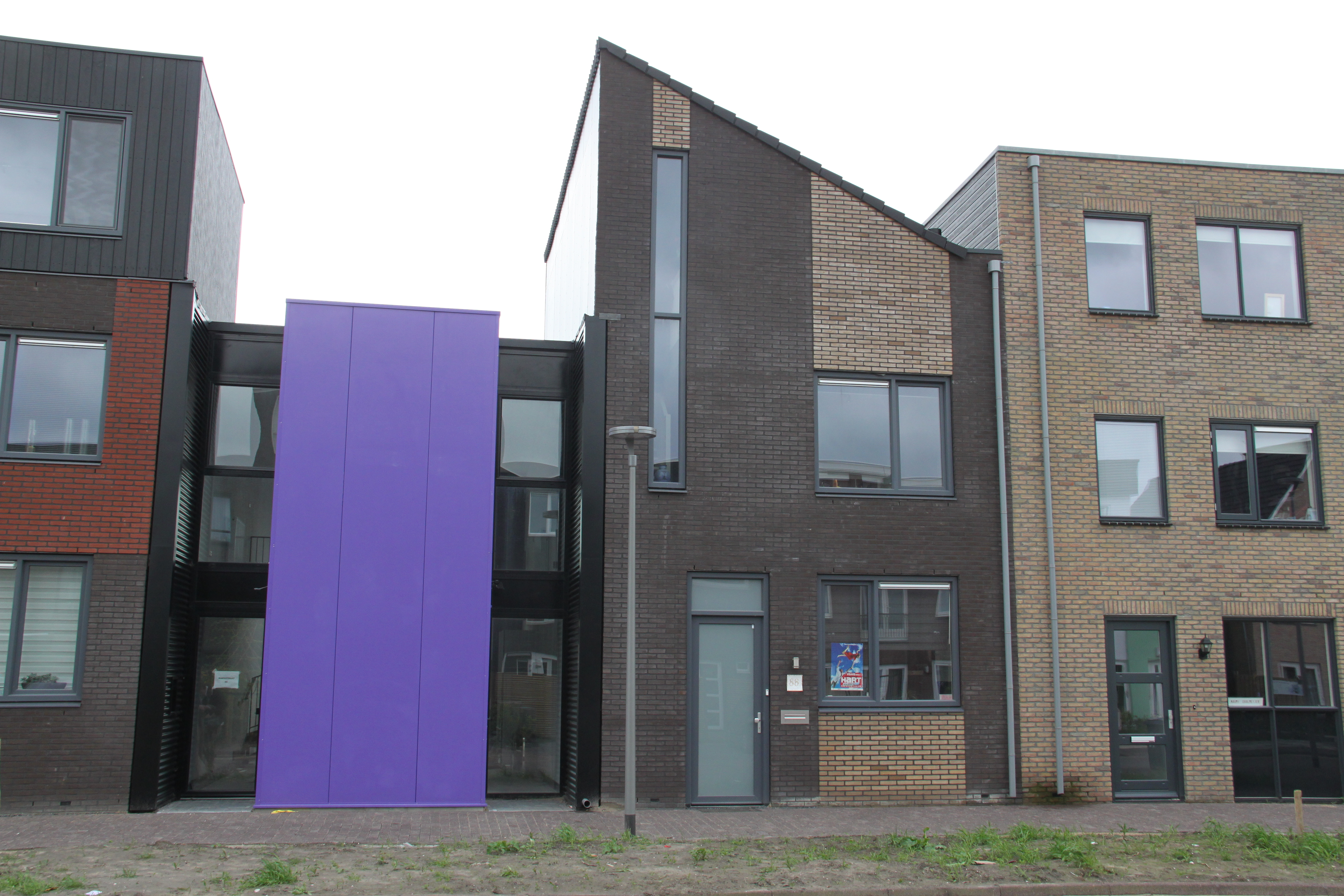

2013, The Hague housing estate Bomenbuurt, participatory project with buildings by famous architects (Hendrik Berlage, Jan Duiker et al.). The residential area Bomenbuurt was planned by Berlage in 1908. Hundred years later municipal officials launched a participatory project. As a result, residents and architects protested against "unaesthetic" extensions on buildings and in private gardens of this area with a special cultural value. (Bomenbuurt: 0,3 from left / 0,4 from above)

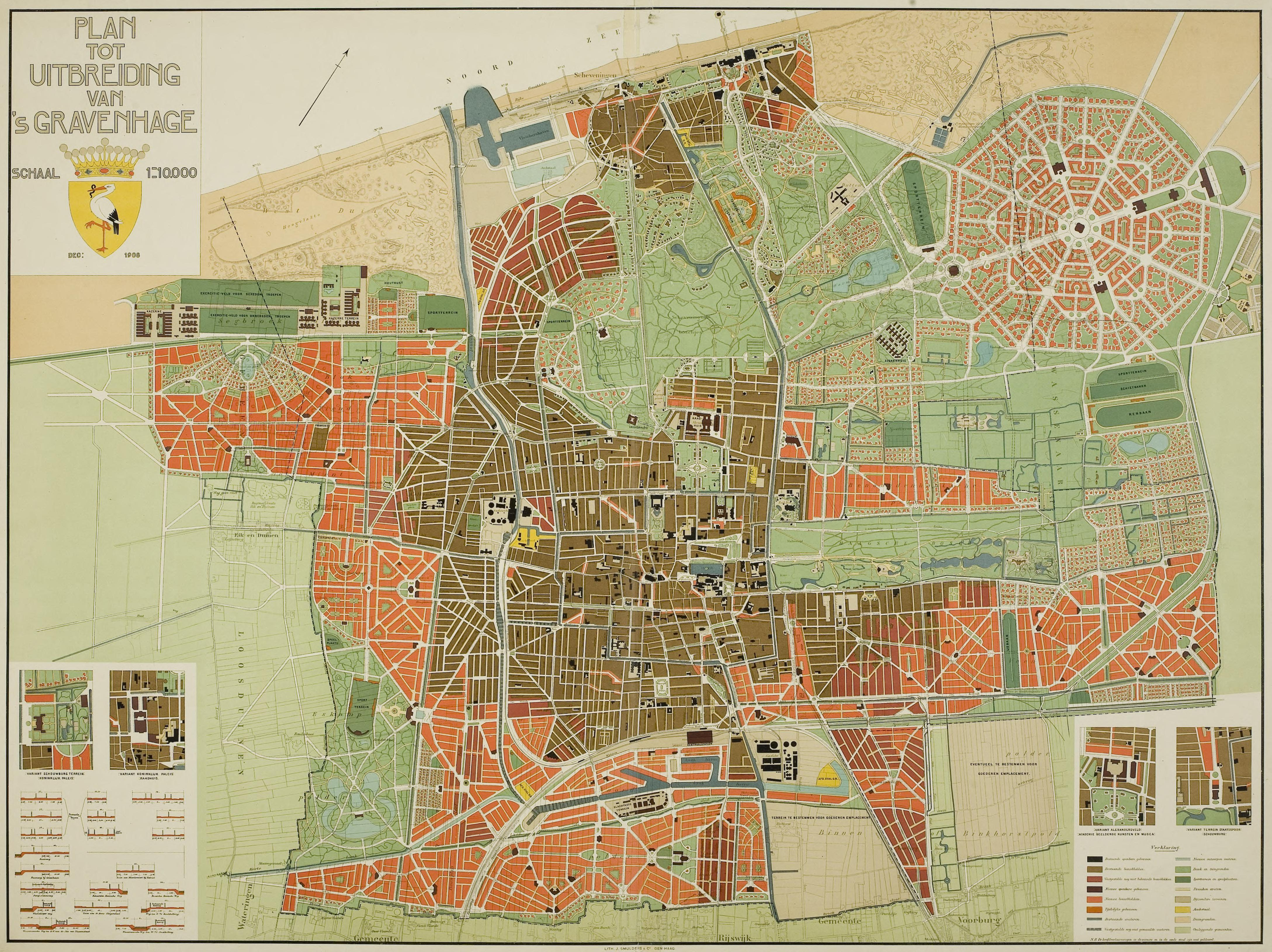
The Hague, masterplan 1908 by Berlage with housing estate Bomenbuurt

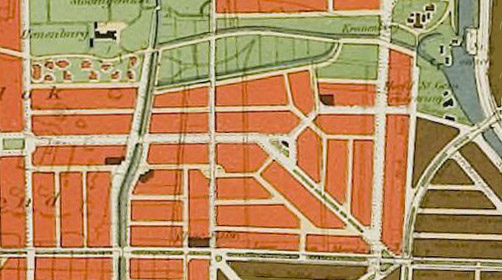
Bomenbuurt

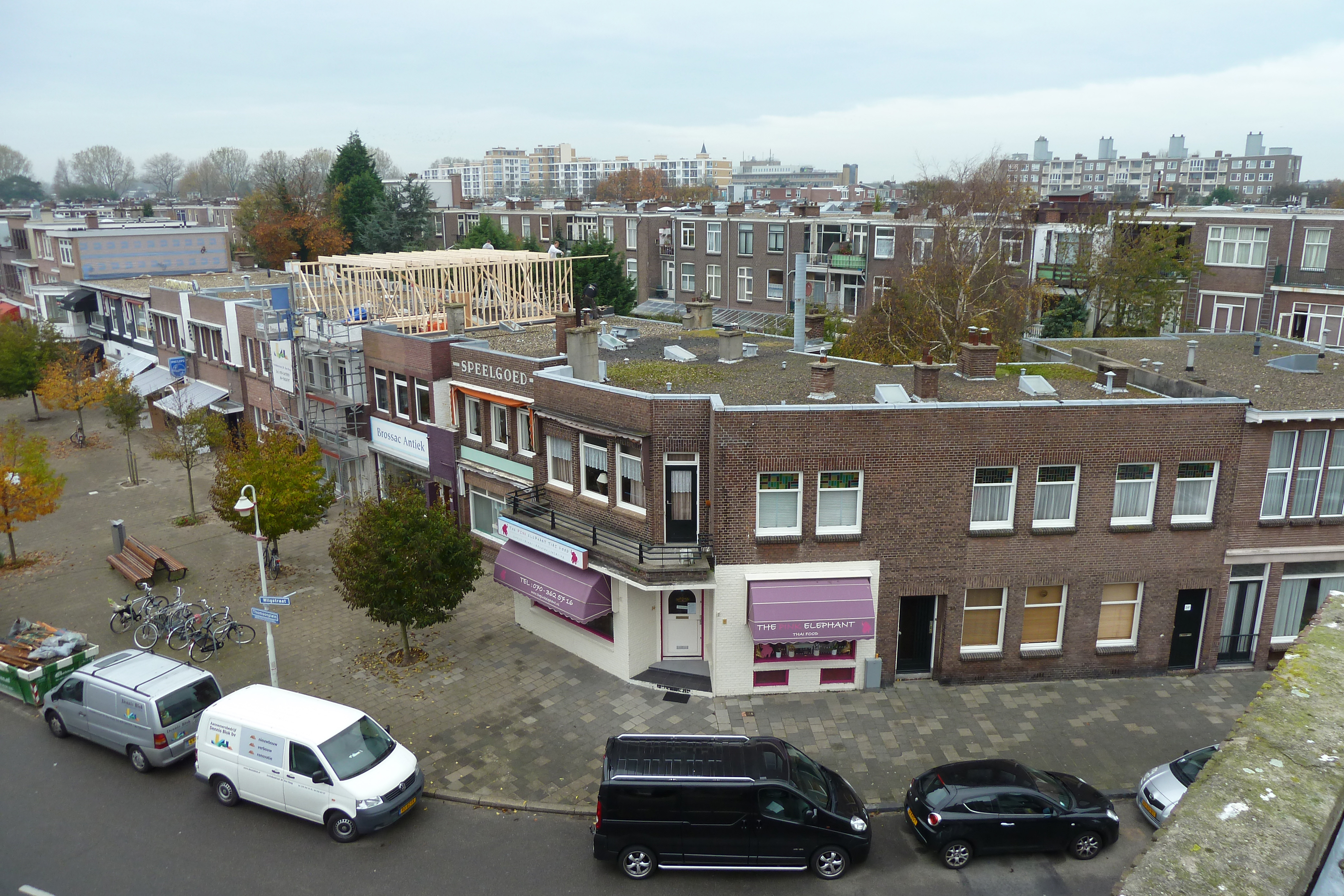
Jan-Duiker-Ensemble Thomsonplein, construction 1922, extension 2011

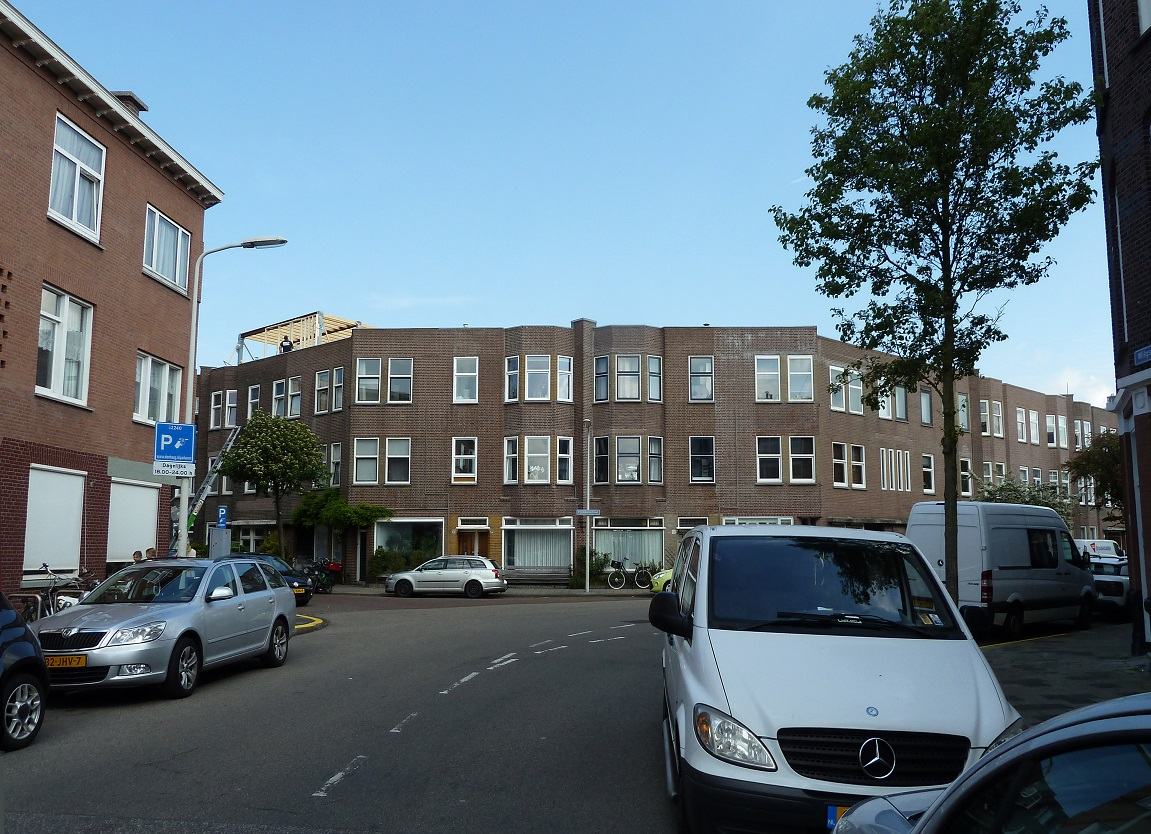
Pijnboomstraat

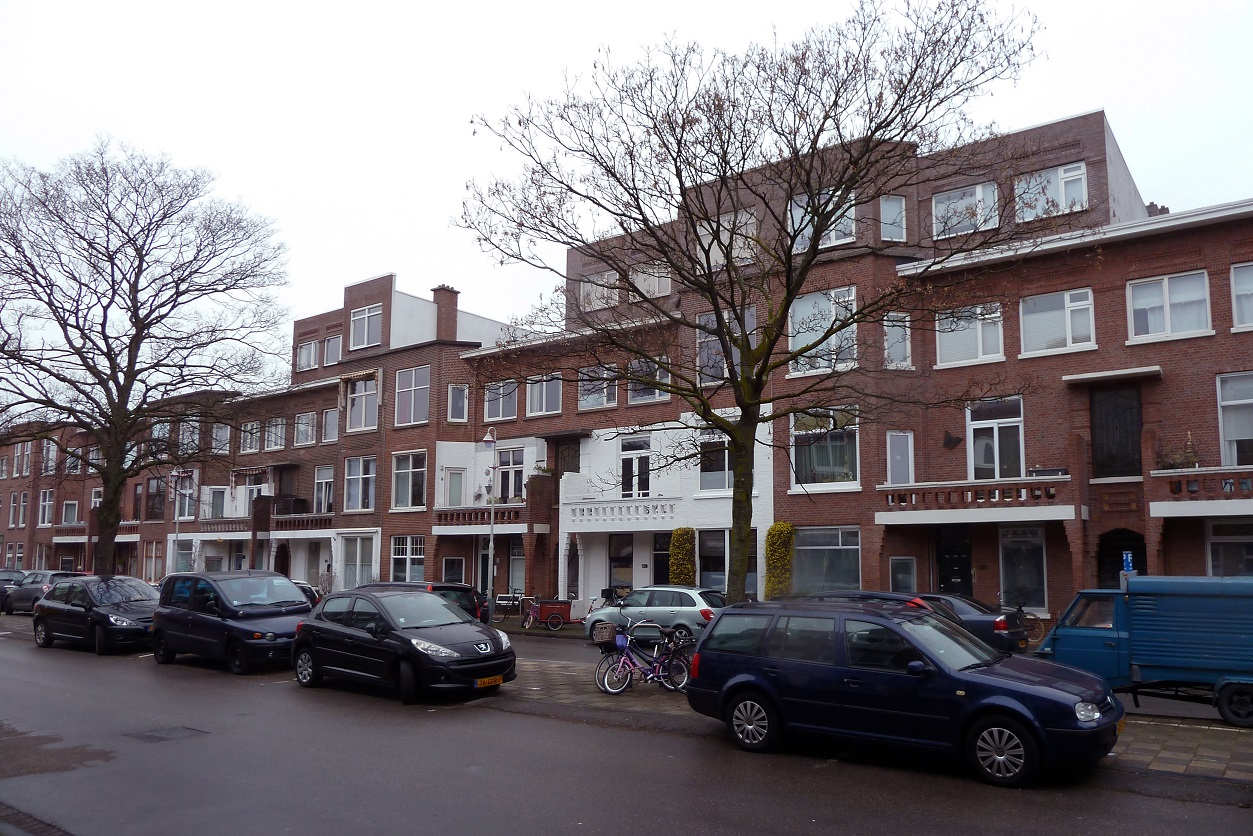
Thomsonlaan

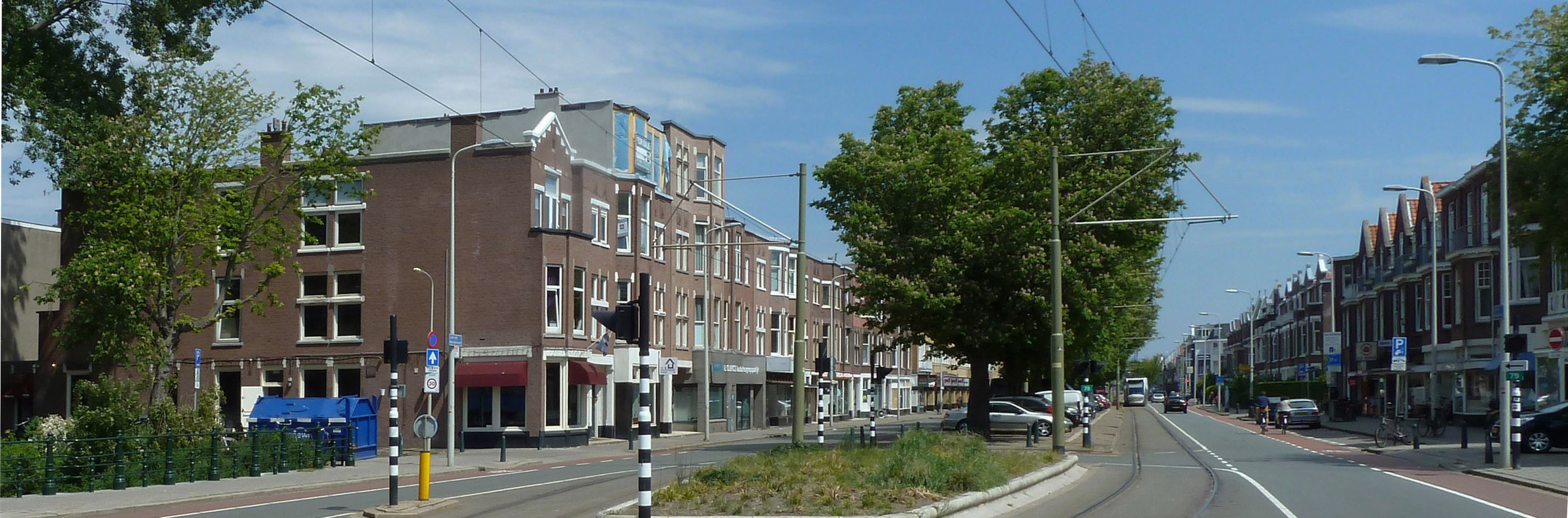
Laan van Meerdervoort

== WOBO bottle ==
In 1960, Habraken designed the World Bottle (WOBO) for Alfred Heineken. The WOBO is a stackable beer bottle that can be reused to build a bottle wall. Initially developed in response to the lack of affordable building materials and the inadequate living conditions that beset Curaçao's lower class, the WOBO is a pioneering example of industrialized recycling and adaptive reuse of materials.

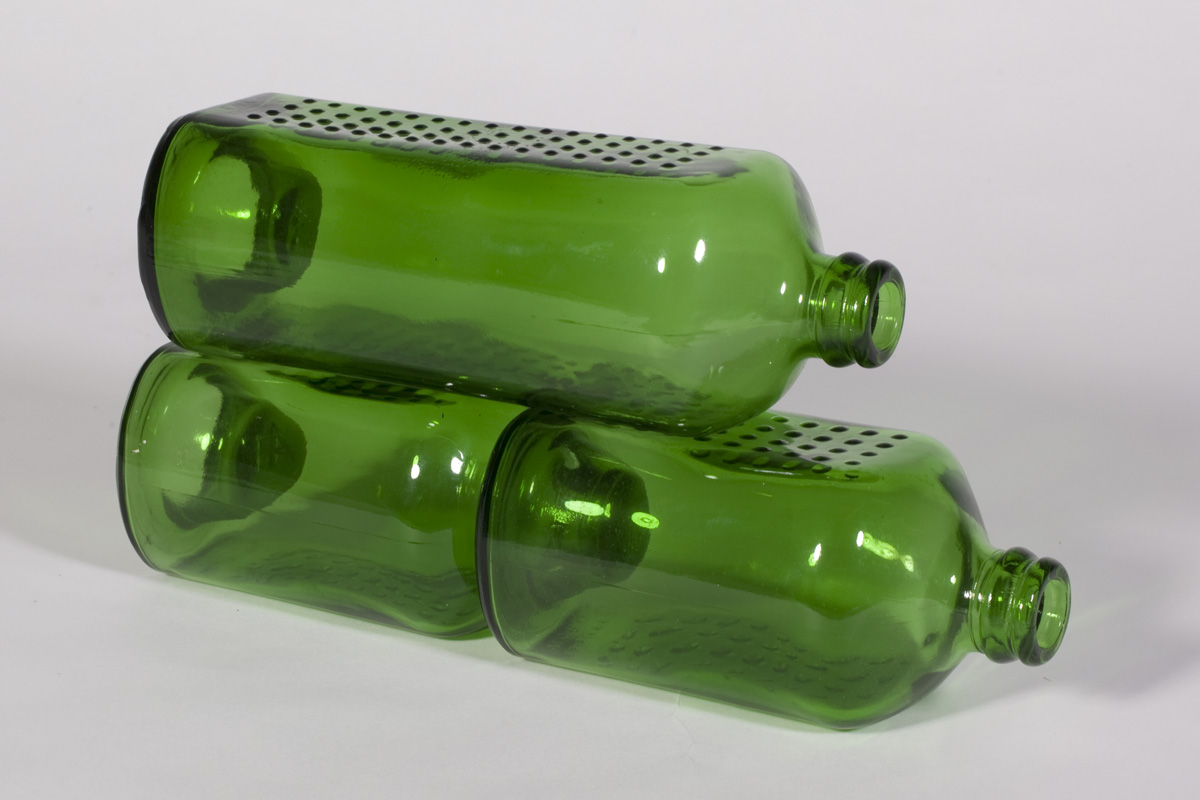
Three WOBO's stacked on top of each other

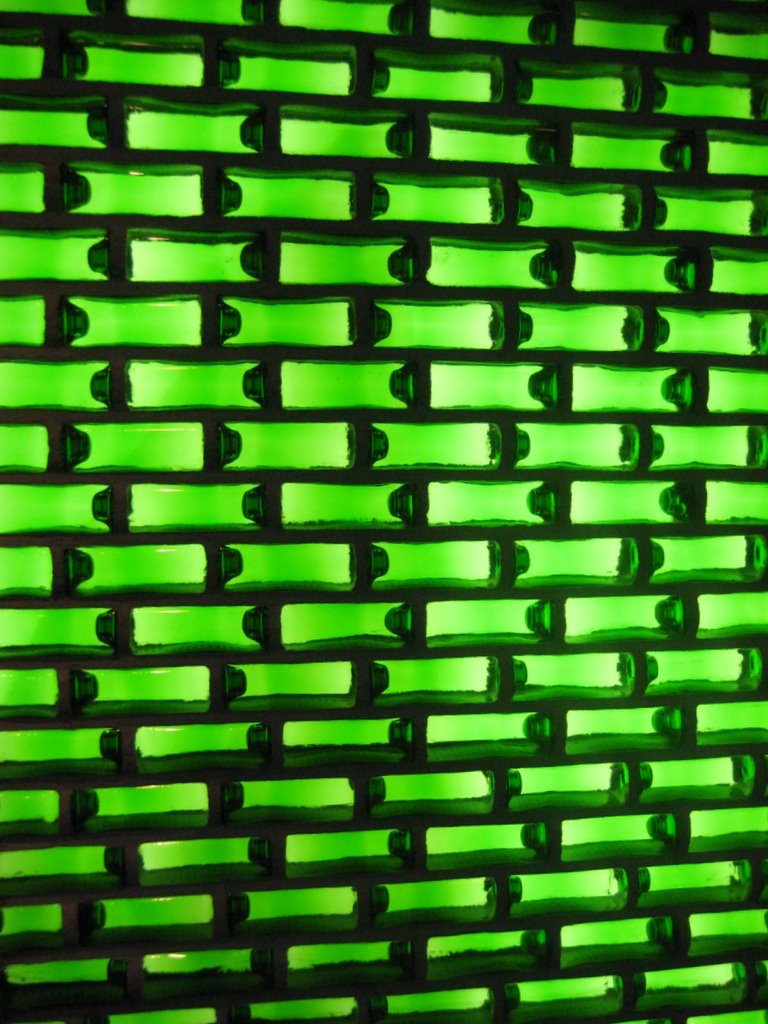
Wall made of WOBO bottles

== Publications ==
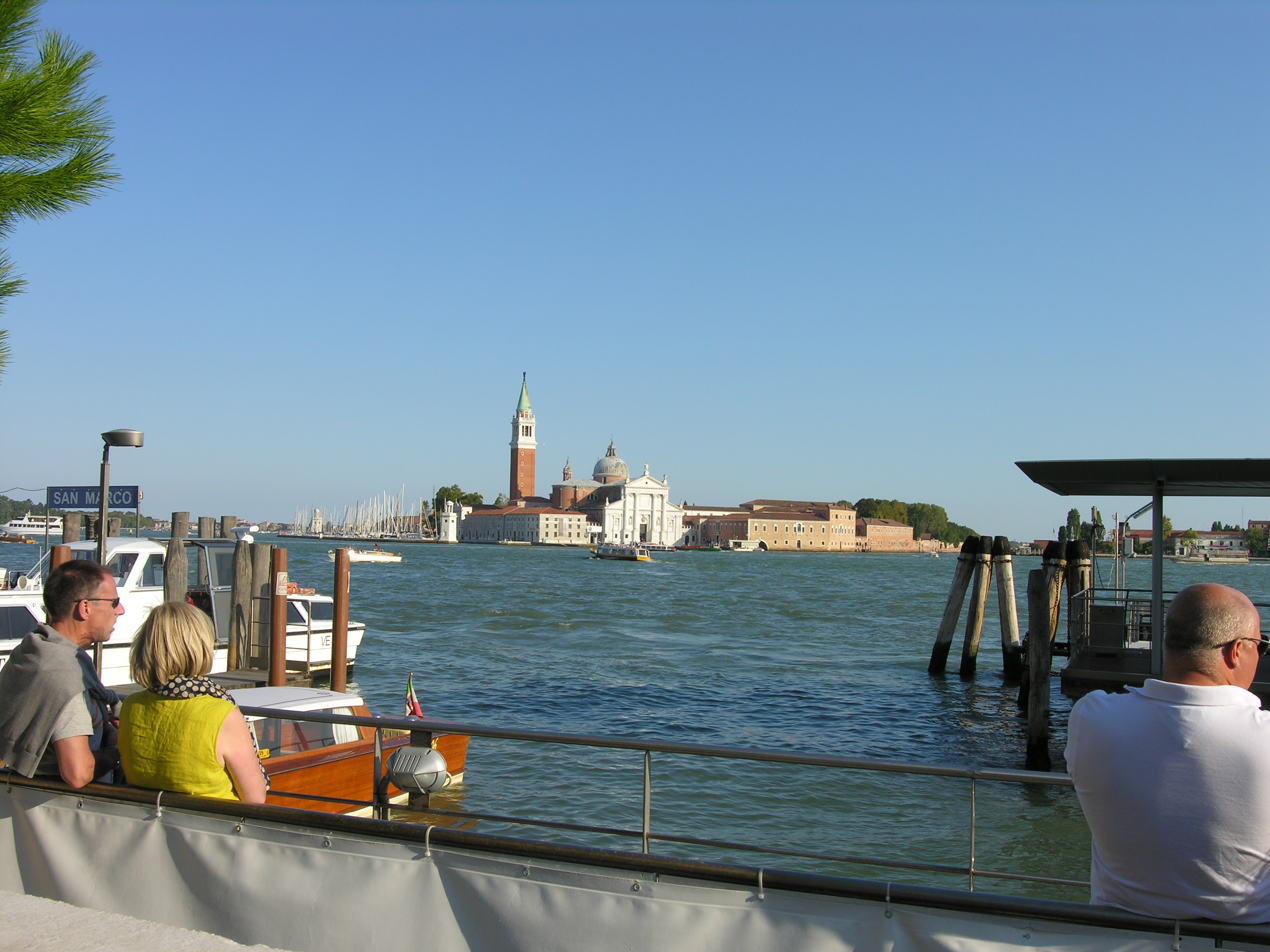
San Giorgio Maggiore in Venice by Andrea Palladio. In "Palladio's Children" Habraken writes about Palladio's concept of architecture.

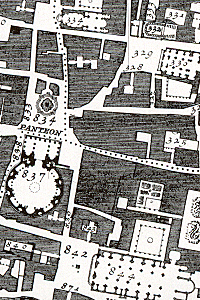
Forum 1/1964 by Habraken, "everyday architecture" (grey), "special architecture" (white), plan Rome by Giambattista Nolli

N. John Habraken:

- Soportes: Vivienda y Ciudad / Supports: Housing and City, N. John Habraken & Andrés Mignucci, Essays on Supports, Thematic Design and architectural education as part of the Laboratorio de Vivienda del Siglo XXI at ETSAB Barcelona School of Architecture. Introduction by Josep Maria Montaner and Zaida Muxí, Barcelona: Universitat Politècnica de Catalunya-BarcelonaTECH, 2009.
- Palladio’s Children, Seven essays on the everyday environment and the architect. Edited by Jonathan Teicher, Taylor and Francis, London, New York, 2005.
- The Structure of the Ordinary, Cambridge, London, MIT Press, 1998
- The Appearance of the Form, Cambridge, Awater Press,1985. Private edition. Second ed. 1988.
- Transformations of the Site, Cambridge, Awater Press, 1983. Private edition. Second ed. 1988.
- The Grunsfeld Variations: A demonstration project on the coordination of a design team in urban design. N. John Habraken with J.A. Aldrete-Haas, R. Chow, T. Hille, P. Krugmeier, M. Lampkin, A. Mallows, A Mignucci, Y. Takase, K. Weller, T. Yokouchi. Cambridge, MIT Laboratory for Architecture and Planning, 1981.
- General Principles about the Way Built Environments Exist, Open House BCB series, SAR, Eindhoven, 1979.
- Variations, the Systematic Design of Supports, with J.T.Boekholt, A.P.Thyssen, P.J.M. Dinjens: MIT Laboratory for Architecture and Planning; distributed by MIT Press, Cambridge, USA and London 1976. English translation by W. Wiewel and Sue Gibbons from the original Dutch publication: Denken in Varianten, Alphen a/d Rijn, Samson, 1974.
- Three R's for Housing, Amsterdam, Scheltema & Holkema, 1970; originally published in Forum, vol. XX, no 1, 1966.
- Supports - An Alternative to Mass Housing, London 1972. Manifesto of the participation movement. First edition in Dutch: De dragers en de mensen - Het einde van de massawoningbouw, Amsterdam 1961. Further editions: Italian 1974, Spanish 1975, German 2000 (with illustrations).

- Le Corbusier, La Ville Radieuse, Boulogne-sur-Seine, 1935. Project "Fort l'Empereur" in Algiers, housing estate with participation of the residents, well-known perspective drawing on page 247.
- Koos Bosma, Housing for the Millions: John Habraken and the SAR (1960-2000), Rotterdam 2000
- Arnulf Lüchinger, 2-Komponenten-Bauweise (Two Components Approach), in combination with Die Träger und die Menschen (Supports) by John Habraken, The Hague 2000.
- Israel Nagore Setién, Open Building in the Collective Housing of the 21st Century: POSSIBILITIES AND LIMITATIONS, Kingston University London 2012.
- De Ruijter, C.J. (1 December 2018). Focus. Hoe kun je nu over Hem horen als Hij niet verkondigd wordt?. Theologia Reformata. 61 (4): 373–379. doi: 10.21827/5be58d462494c. ISSN 0040-5612.
