= Arnulf Lüchinger =

Swiss architect, architecture writer and painter

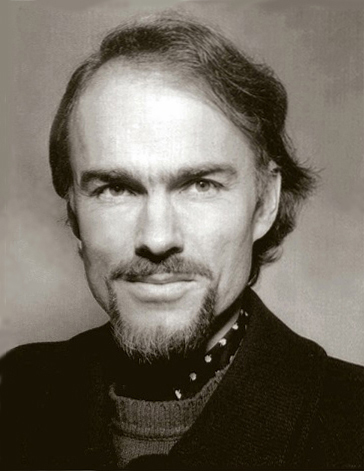
- Lüchinger in 1980
- Born: 22 February 1941 (age 85); St. Gallen, Switzerland
- Education: Delft University of Technology; Royal Academy of Art, The Hague
- Occupations: Architect; Structuralism; Architecture criticism Painting
- Awards: World Biennale of Architecture 1987, Gold Medal for book "Herman Hertzberger 1959–86”

Arnulf Lüchinger (born 22 February 1941 in St. Gallen, Switzerland) is a Swiss–Dutch architect, author and editor of architectural publications. He recognized Structuralism in architecture as a new trend and launched it internationally. Since 1970 he has lived with his family in The Hague.

== Life ==
=== Architecture education ===
Arnulf Lüchinger attended the evening classes at the University of Applied Sciences in St. Gallen and graduated in 1968. During the studies he was involved in the interior restoration of the baroque cathedral in St. Gallen, which became a UNESCO World Heritage Site in 1983. An earlier member of his family, the musician Martin Vogt (Musiker), was responsible for the sacred music in the same cathedral. In 1969 Lüchinger left Switzerland and worked in the Michael Scott office in Dublin from 1969 to 1970, which was awarded the RIBA Gold Medal in 1975. Here he came into contact with the international architecture scene and the published buildings by the Dutch architects Aldo van Eyck, Herman Hertzberger, Piet Blom and Jaap Bakema. Since his partner was from the Netherlands, he graduated in 1976 at the Delft University of Technology, where Van Eyck, Hertzberger and Bakema were professors.

=== Launch of the Structuralism architectural trend ===
During the education at the TU Delft from 1971 to 1976 it became apparent that a new architectural trend was emerging in the Netherlands. The architectural historian Francis Strauven wrote about this in 2014: "Dutch structuralism as an architectural trend was recognized and launched internationally by the Swiss architect Arnulf Lüchinger, since 1974." In 2009, Tomas Valena organized the international symposium "Structuralism Reloaded" in Munich, at which Lüchinger was invited as a guest of honor. The book Structuralism Reloaded from this symposium was published in 2011 with 47 articles by international authors, including an article by Lüchinger.

=== Architectural office and architectural publisher ===
Already during the education in Delft and afterwards Lüchinger worked freelance in The Hague, in the combination of architecture office and architecture publisher (Arch-Edition). From his completed buildings, the two residential buildings in St. Gallenkappel received publicity in international magazines, in the German-language magazine Bauen+Wohnen 12/1977 and in the Japanese magazine Architecture and Urbanism 2/1979 with the title "Contemporary Houses of the World". In the 1990s, Lüchinger worked in Switzerland for a number of years, including as a partner and design architect in the Werner Künzler office in Arbon, with whom he had already cooperated in St. Gallen from 1965 to 1969.

=== Visual arts ===
In the foreword to the book Structuralism in Architecture and Urban Planning Lüchinger wrote (according to the view of an architecture critic): "I came upon Structuralism as an architectural movement through an interest in the visual arts, in painting, sculpture and architecture. The built examples shown here are thus selected for their artistic quality as well as for the degree to which the ideological precepts of the new movement were realised." Lüchinger's interest in fine arts is also expressed in the fact that he attended the evening classes at the Royal Academy of Fine Arts in The Hague and graduated in 2007. After the studies he was invited to set up a solo exhibition at the gallery "De Fietsenstalling" in The Hague.

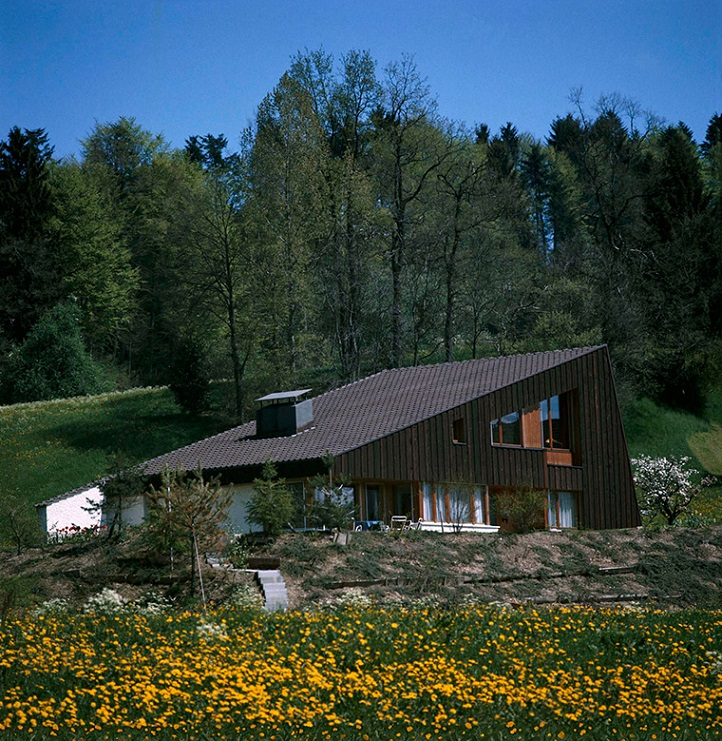
Two single-family houses in St. Gallenkappel 1974

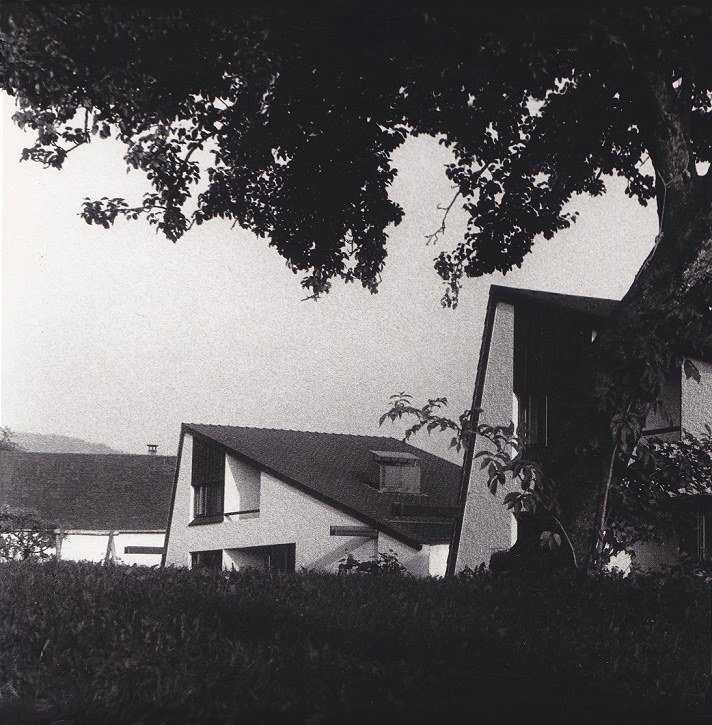
North side

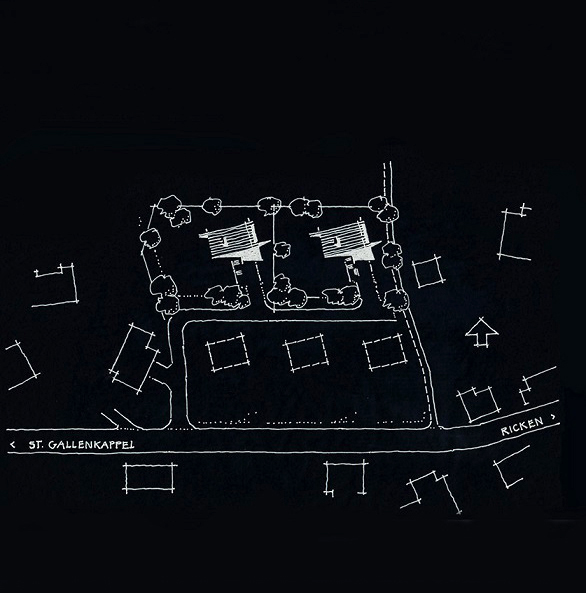
Situation plan

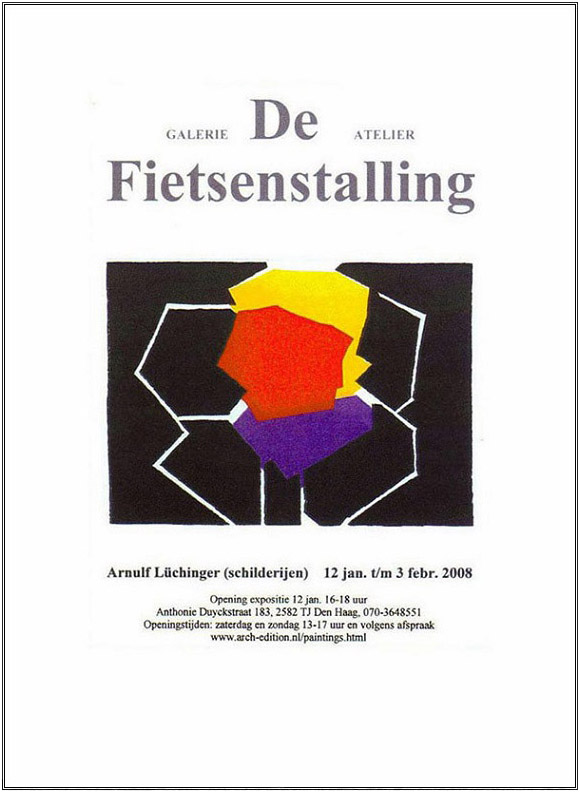
Solo exhibition after the KABK-art-education in The Hague 2008

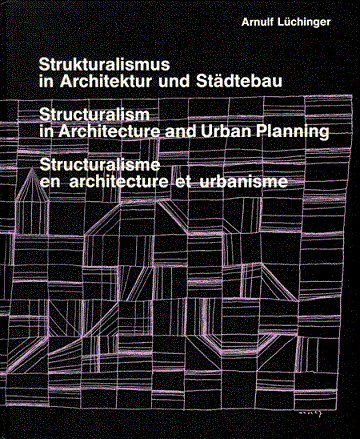
Structuralism international movement book 1980

== Structuralism ==
Forty years after Lüchinger's first structuralism article, Francis Strauven wrote in 2014 about Lüchinger's contribution to the emergence of the new architectural trend. Strauven added that structuralism was included in the international literature by Kenneth Frampton, among others. When the new trend emerged, Jürgen Joedicke was also involved. In 1976 he commissioned Arnulf Lüchinger to write a book on structuralism after the theme number "Strukturalismus" in Bauen+Wohnen 1/1976 had been well received in the professional world. – With regard to the naming of the new trend, various terms already existed before 1974, but only sporadically and without reference to an international architectural movement. The new terms were published in the following languages: German 1958, Italian 1959, French 1964, Dutch 1969, English 1970, etc.

=== Publications (selection) ===
His publications include:

- 1974 – Article: "Structuralism", in Bauen+Wohnen 5/1974, pp. 209–212, Zürich-Munich. About the architecture of Herman Hertzberger (competition projects town hall Valkenswaard and city hall Amsterdam, office building Centraal Beheer in Apeldoorn). From the Dutch architectural movement the first article entitled Structuralism in architecture magazines.
- 1976 – Theme number: "Structuralism – A new trend in architecture", in Bauen+Wohnen 1/1976, Zürich-Munich (guest editor for this special edition). Dutch structuralism, international examples in the introduction. Quotations from Herman Hertzberger and Kenzo Tange.
- 1977 – Article: "Dutch Structuralism – Contribution to a present-day architecture", in Architecture and Urbanism 3/1977, pp. 47–66, Tokyo. Article in special number on architecture by Herman Hertzberger. Toshio Nakamura was editor of Architecture and Urbanism (A+U).
- 1980 – Book: Structuralism in Architecture and Urban Planning, ISBN 978-3782806145, 3 languages G+E+F, 144 pp., Karl Krämer Verlag Stuttgart, 1980. Structuralism as an international movement. Volume 14 of the Documents of Modern Architecture. Jürgen Joedicke was publisher of the Documents and editor of Bauen+Wohnen (B+W).
- 1980 – Articles: Herman Hertzberger, Piet Blom, John Habraken, in book: Muriel Emanuel [ed.], Contemporary Architects I, ISBN 978-0333252895, St. James Press London-Detroit, 1980. Aldo van Eyck was added in Contemporary Architects III, ISBN 978-1558621824, of 1994. Dutch architects of structuralism.
- 1987 – Book: Herman Hertzberger 1959–86 – Buildings and Projects, ISBN 978-9071890017, 3 languages G+E+F, 384 pp., Arch-Edition Den Haag 1987. Influential architect of structuralism, work overview of the first 27 years. See also Awards.
- 2000 – Book: 2-Komponenten-Bauweise (Two Components Approach), ISBN 978-3952202319, double edition with Die Träger (Supports) by John Habraken, 112 pp., 90 images, Arch-Edition Den Haag, 2000. Participation in housing, partial aspect of structuralism.
- 2011 – Article: "Structuralism in Architecture and Urban Planning – Developments in the Netherlands – Introduction of the Term", pp. 87–95, in book: Tomas Valena et al. (ed.), Structuralism Reloaded, ISBN 978-3936681475, edition Axel Menges, Stuttgart-London 2011.

See also: Structuralism with interpretations by different authors. Publications (selection) by Lüchinger.

== Awards ==
- Book: Herman Hertzberger 1959–86 – Buildings and Projects, ISBN 978-9071890017, World Biennale of Architecture 1987 in Sofia, Award at the exhibition of architecture books with the quote: Gold Medal "Herman Hertzberger" by Arnulf Lüchinger.

== Videos ==
- Bart Lootsma, German lecture "Strukturalismus-2", University of Innsbruck, 2015. Bart Lootsma interprets Lüchinger's contribution (Video Vimeo 14:00–23:00).
- Francis Strauven, Dutch lecture "Structuralisme", University of Twente Enschede, 2014. – Quote: 'Structuralism recognized and launched internationally by Lüchinger' (Video 04:20–05:00).
