= Heineken World Bottle (WOBO) =

Beer bottle prototype

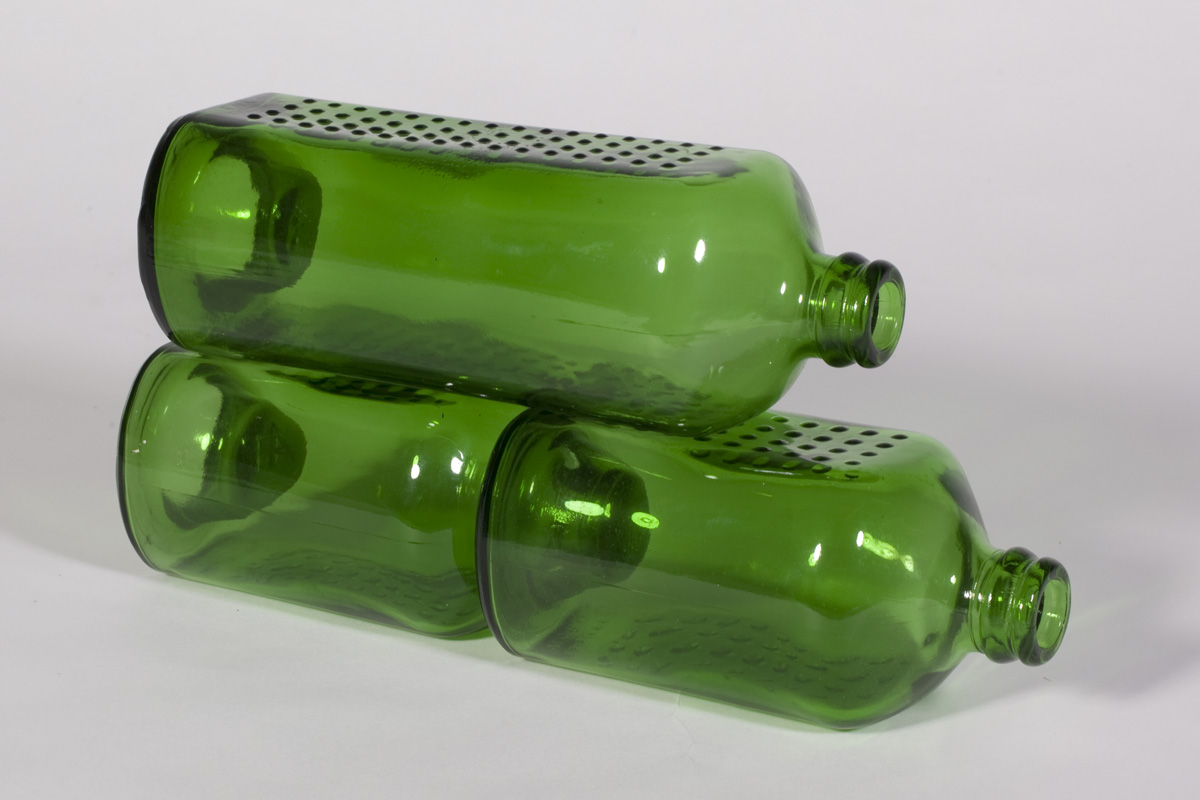
- Type: Beer bottle
- Inventor: Alfred Heineken
- Inception: 1963
- Manufacturer: Heineken
- Available: No
- Last production year: 1964

The World Bottle, also called WOBO, is a prototype of beer bottle designed in 1960 by Alfred Heineken which could be reused as a brick for construction.

== Conception ==
While on a world tour of Heineken factories in 1960, Alfred Heineken had an epiphany on the Caribbean island of Curaçao, where he saw many bottles littering the beach because the island had no economic means of returning the bottles to the bottling plants from which they had come. He was also concerned with the lack of affordable building materials and the inadequate living conditions plaguing Curaçao's lower-class. Envisioning a solution for these problems, he asked Dutch architect N. John Habraken to design what he called "a brick that holds beer."

== Design ==
Over the next three years, the WOBO went through a design process. Some of the early designs were of interlocking and self-aligning bottles. The idea derived from a belief that the need for mortar would add complexity and expense to the bottle wall's intended simplicity and affordability. Some designs proved to be effective building materials, but too heavy and slow-forming to be economically produced. Other designs were rejected by Heineken based on aesthetic preferences. In the end, the bottle that was selected was a compromise between the previous designs.

The interlocking bottle design

The bottle was designed to be interlocking, laid horizontally and bonded with cement mortar with a silicone additive. The necks were short and fitted into a large recess in the base, the bottles were square section with dimpled sides to bond with the mortar. A 10 ft (3.0 m) x 10 ft (3.0 m) shack would take approximately 1,000 bottles to build. In 1963, 60,000-100,000 WOBOs were produced as a trial batch at Royal Leerdam Crystal in two sizes, 350 mm (33cl) and 500 mm (50cl) tall. This size difference was necessary in order to bond the bottles when building a wall, in the same way as a half brick is necessary when building with bricks.

The main reasons why the concept did not go in to full production were liability and the possible brand association with poverty, along with the fact that the consumer simply liked the standard easy-to-hold cylindrical bottles more. Alfred Heineken did not develop the WOBO concept further and the idea never got a chance to materialize. Unfortunately, most of the bottles were destroyed during the trial production and as such, they are now very rare and have become a collector's item.

== Structures ==
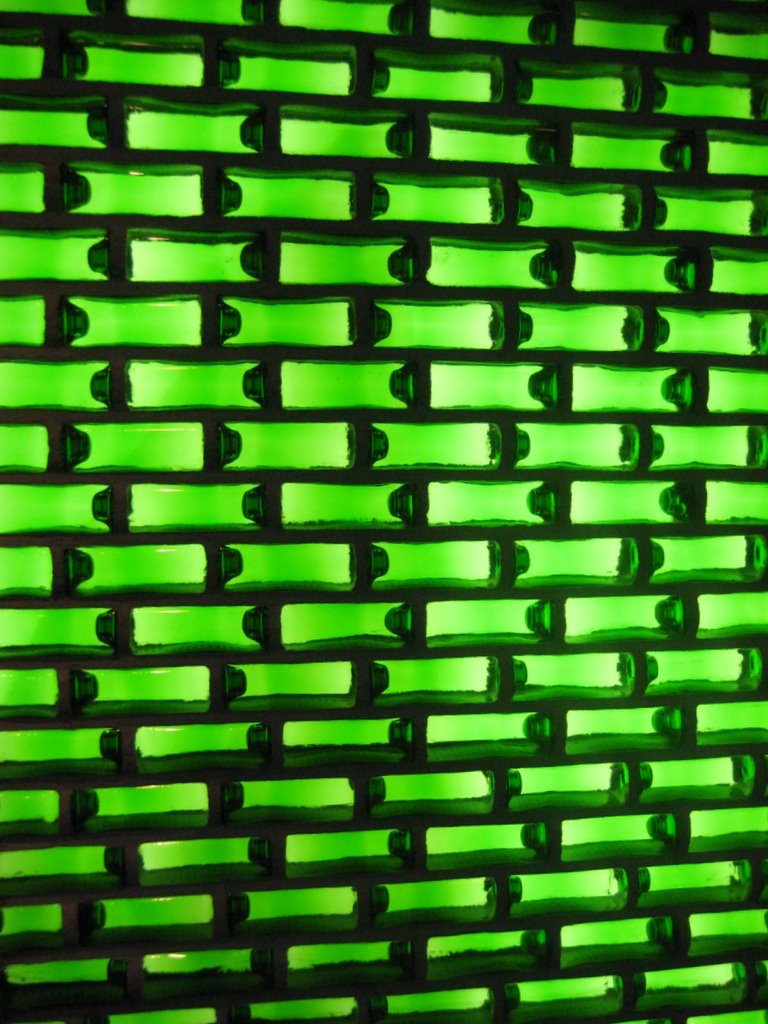
WOBO bottle wall, Amsterdam

Only few WOBO structures exist. Two were located on the Heineken estate in Noordwijk. The first was a small shed which had a corrugated iron roof and timber supports where the builder could not work out how to resolve the junction between necks and bases running in the same direction. This shed has since been removed. Later, a timber double garage was renovated with WOBO siding.

In 1975, author Martin Pawley dedicated a chapter to the World Bottle in his book Garbage housing. When Alfred Heineken heard about this, plans were made to construct a complete building with the bottles at Eindhoven University of Technology, however, Alfred Heineken and the governing body of the university did not reach an agreement, and the plan was cancelled.

Rinus van den Berg, a Dutch industrial & architectural designer, designed several buildings while working with John Habraken in the 1970s.

There is also a wall made of WOBO at Heineken Experience in Amsterdam.

== Display in museums ==
In 2013, the World Bottle appeared in an exhibition called Adhocracy, which was shown in the New Museum in New York and was moved to LimeWharf in London.

There is a World Bottle on display in the Victoria and Albert Museum in London, and in Het Nieuwe Instituut in Rotterdam.

== Spirit of Heineken ==
In 2019, the Heineken company gave out 1000 original WOBO 50cl bottles to special relations of the company and family in their 'Spirit of Heineken' project.

== Similar projects ==
A similar project to the World Bottle was the Block-O-Beer-Flasche (Block-O-Beer-bottle) developed in 1959 by the East German Radeberger Brewery.

Similar projects using plastic bottles instead of glass bottles have been undertaken. In 2007, a Swiss architecture firm designed United Bottle, which is a similar concept of recyclable bottles for building, but with PET bottles instead. Earlier, activist Susana Heisse came up with Ecobricks, a method which utilises standard used plastic bottles stuffed with leftover plastic to use as building material.

== See also ==
- Bottle wall
- Glass recycling
- Reuse of bottles
