= Herman Hertzberger =

Dutch architect (born 1932)

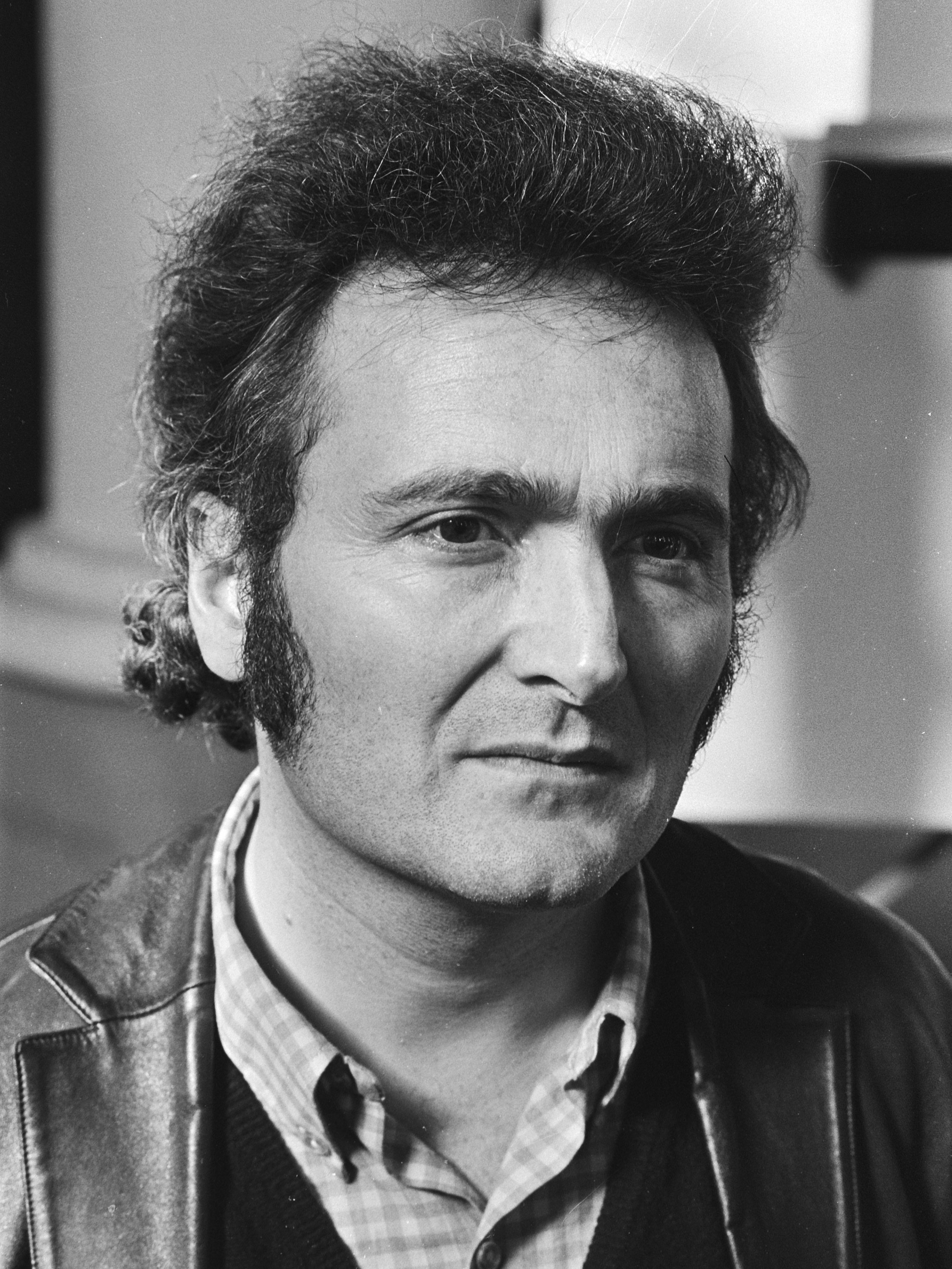
- Hertzberger in 1970
- Born: 6 July 1932 (age 94); Amsterdam, Netherlands
- Education: Delft University of Technology
- Occupation: Architect
- Awards: RIBA Royal Gold Medal
- Buildings: Montessori school, Delft (1966–70); Centraal Beheer office building, Apeldoorn (1970–72)
- Projects: Diagoonwoningen, Delft (1971)

Herman Hertzberger (born 6 July 1932) is a Dutch architect, and a professor emeritus of the Delft University of Technology. In 2012 he received the Royal Gold Medal of the Royal Institute of British Architects.

== Biography ==
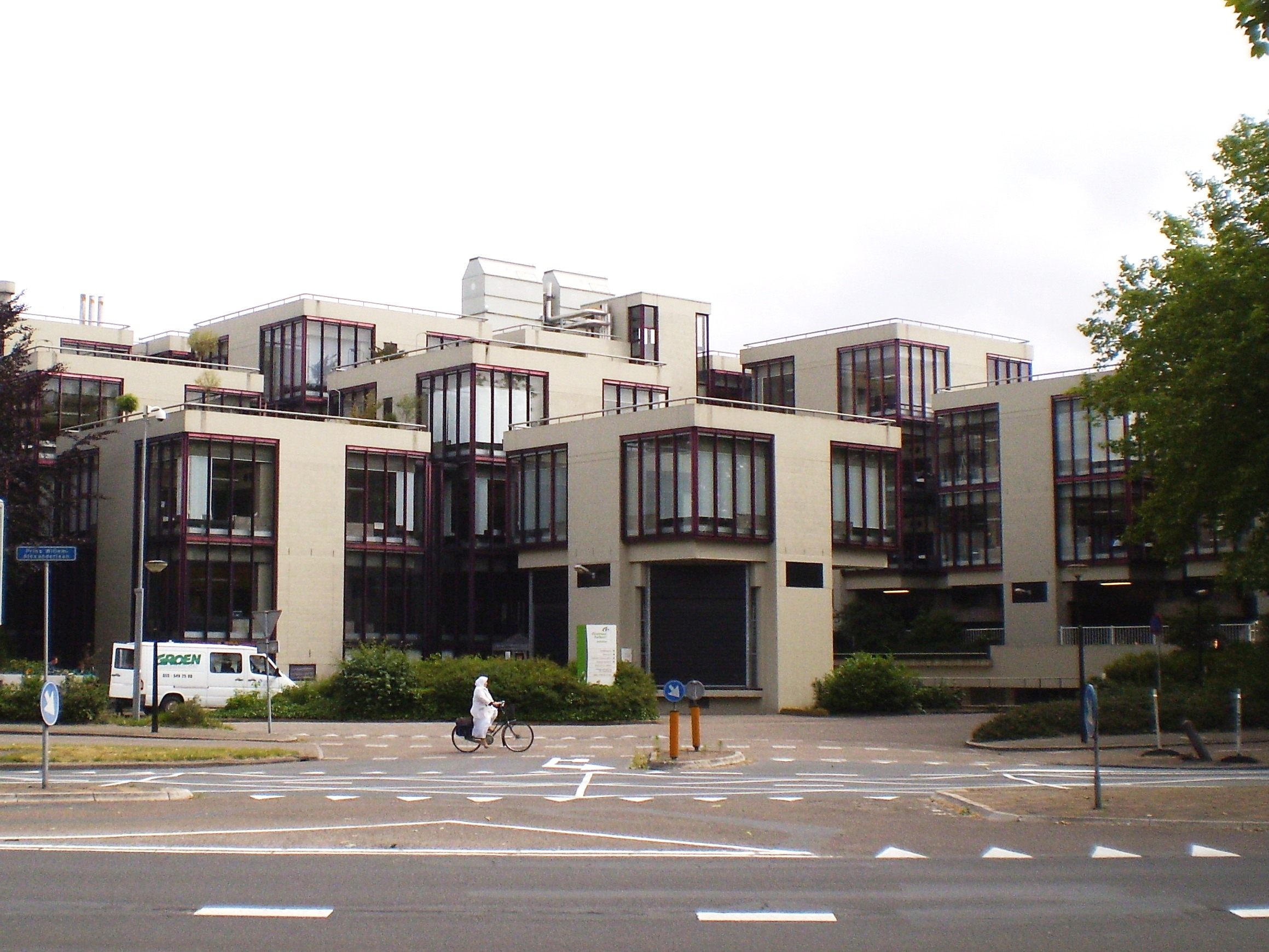
Centraal Beheer office building, participation inside, Apeldoorn 1972

Herman Hertzberger was born on 6 July 1932 in Amsterdam.

He completed his studies at the Delft University of Technology in 1958, where he was a professor from 1970 to 1999.

From 1959 to 1963 he was a part of the infamous FORUM editorial, together with Aldo van Eyck and Jaap Bakema. The editorial stirred up the architectural discussion at the time, especially concerning the reconstruction of dwellings after the Second World War.

== Career ==
Hertzberger and Aldo van Eyck influenced the development of the Dutch Structuralist movement of the 1960s and 1970s. Among his buildings are the experimental houses known as "Diagoon Houses" (1971), the Montessori school in Delft (1966–70) and the administration building for the Centraal Beheer Insurance Company building in Apeldoorn (1970–72).

Hertzberger has been criticized for the inelegance of the façades of his buildings, and for concentrating on their functions and interiors rather than aesthetics.

== Books ==
His books include:

- Lessons for Students in Architecture, 1991, ISBN 978-9064504648
- Space and the Architect: Lessons in Architecture 2, 1999, ISBN 978-9064503801
- Space and Learning, 2008, ISBN 978-9064506444.
- (with Arnulf Lüchinger and Rijk Rietveld) Herman Hertzberger 1959–86, Buildings and Projects, The Hague, 1987, ISBN 978-9071890017.

A book about the Diagoon Houses:

- Nahmer, Robert von der; Hertzberger, Herman (2021). Space for living : the experimental Diagoon Houses of Herman Hertzberger. Delft, Netherlands. ISBN 978-90-90-35455-2. OCLC 1317681636.

=== Awards ===
- Richard Neutra Award for Professional Excellence 1989, California State Polytechnic University, Pomona
- RIBA Royal Gold Medal 2012
- Thomas Jefferson Medal in Architecture 2015, University of Virginia

He is an Accademico d'Onore, or honorary member, of the Accademia delle Arti del Disegno of Florence.

=== Buildings ===
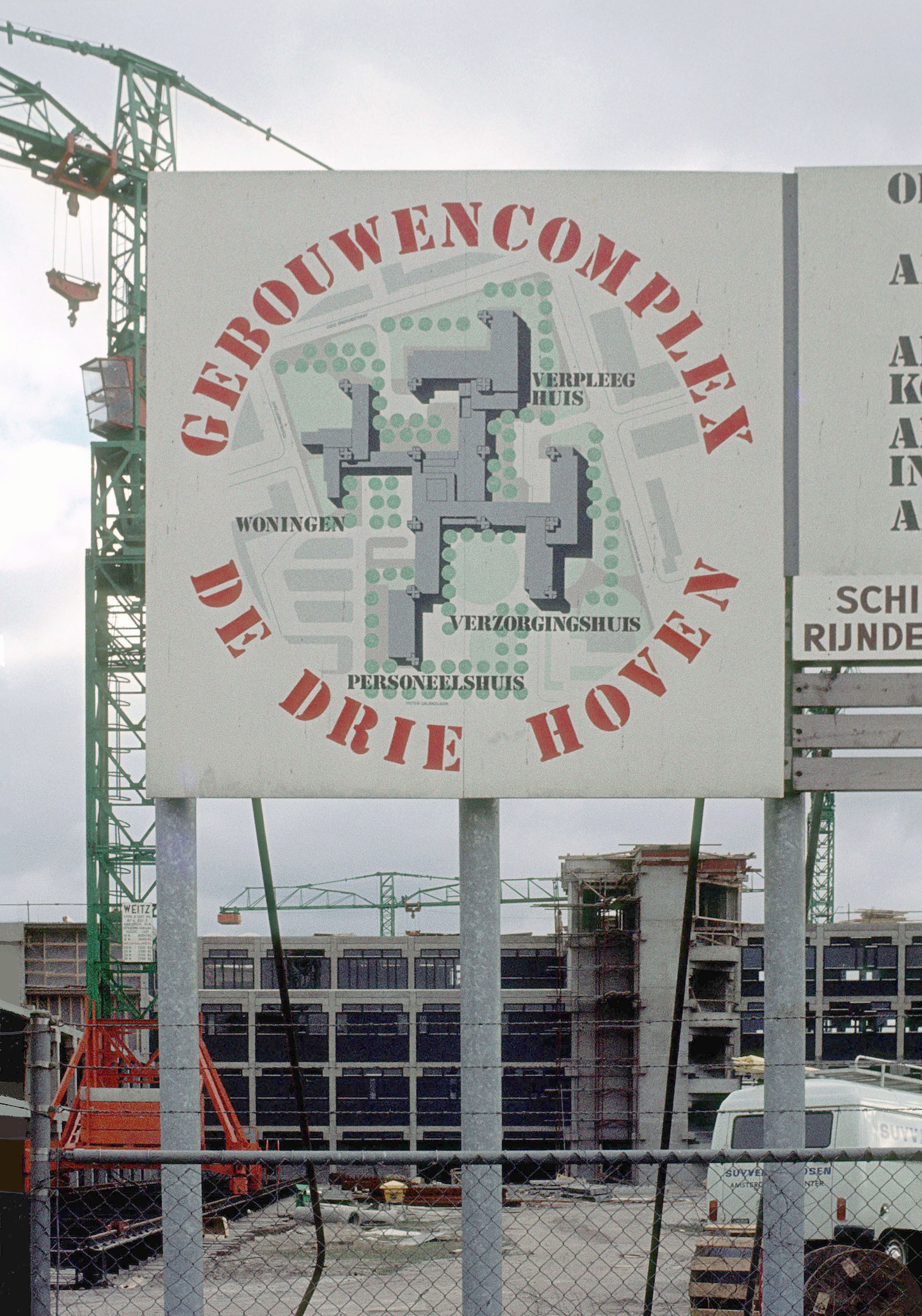
De Drie Hoven

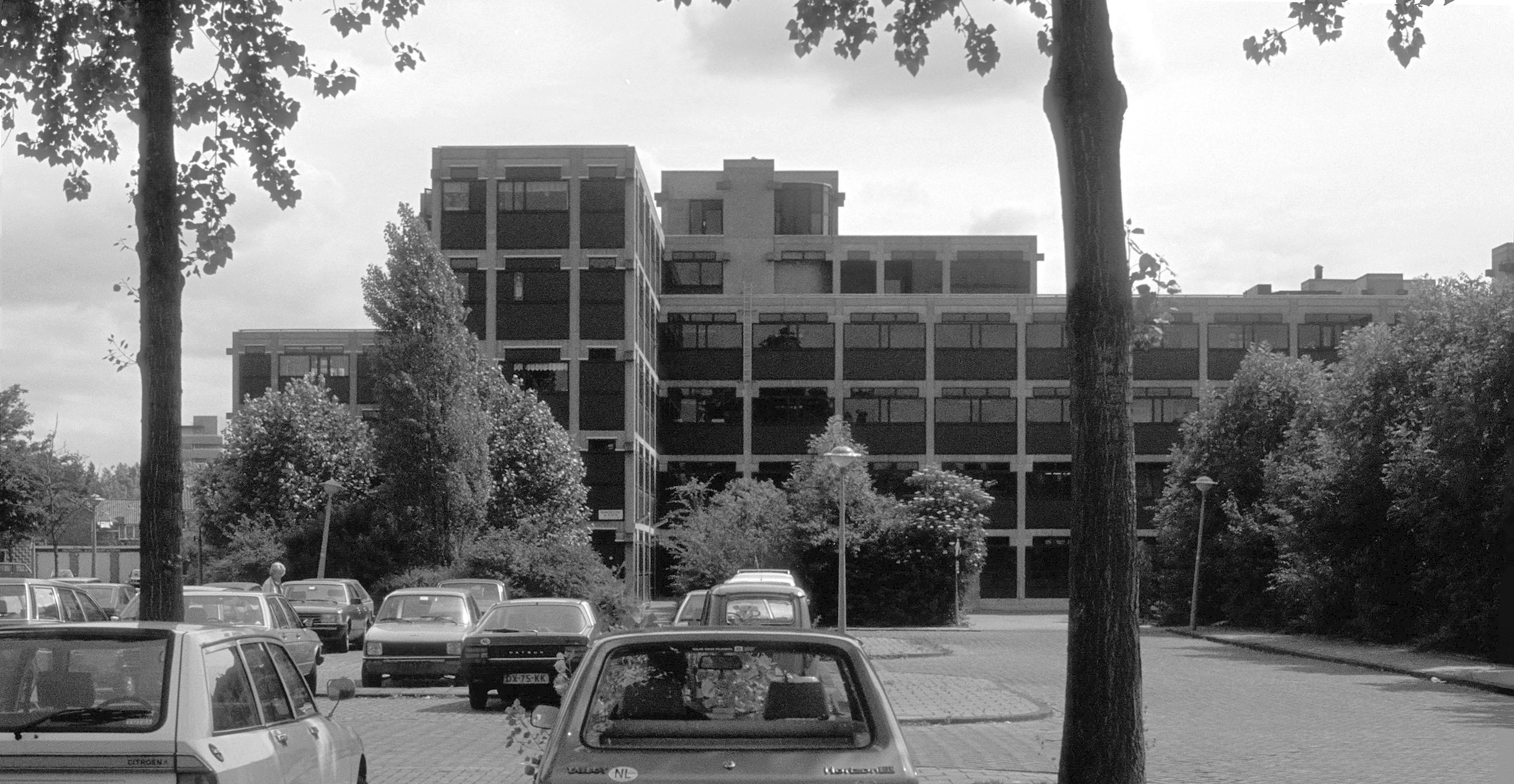
De Drie Hoven, residential building for elderly people in Amsterdam-Slotervaart, 1974

De Drie Hoven, video with portrait of Herman Hertzberger

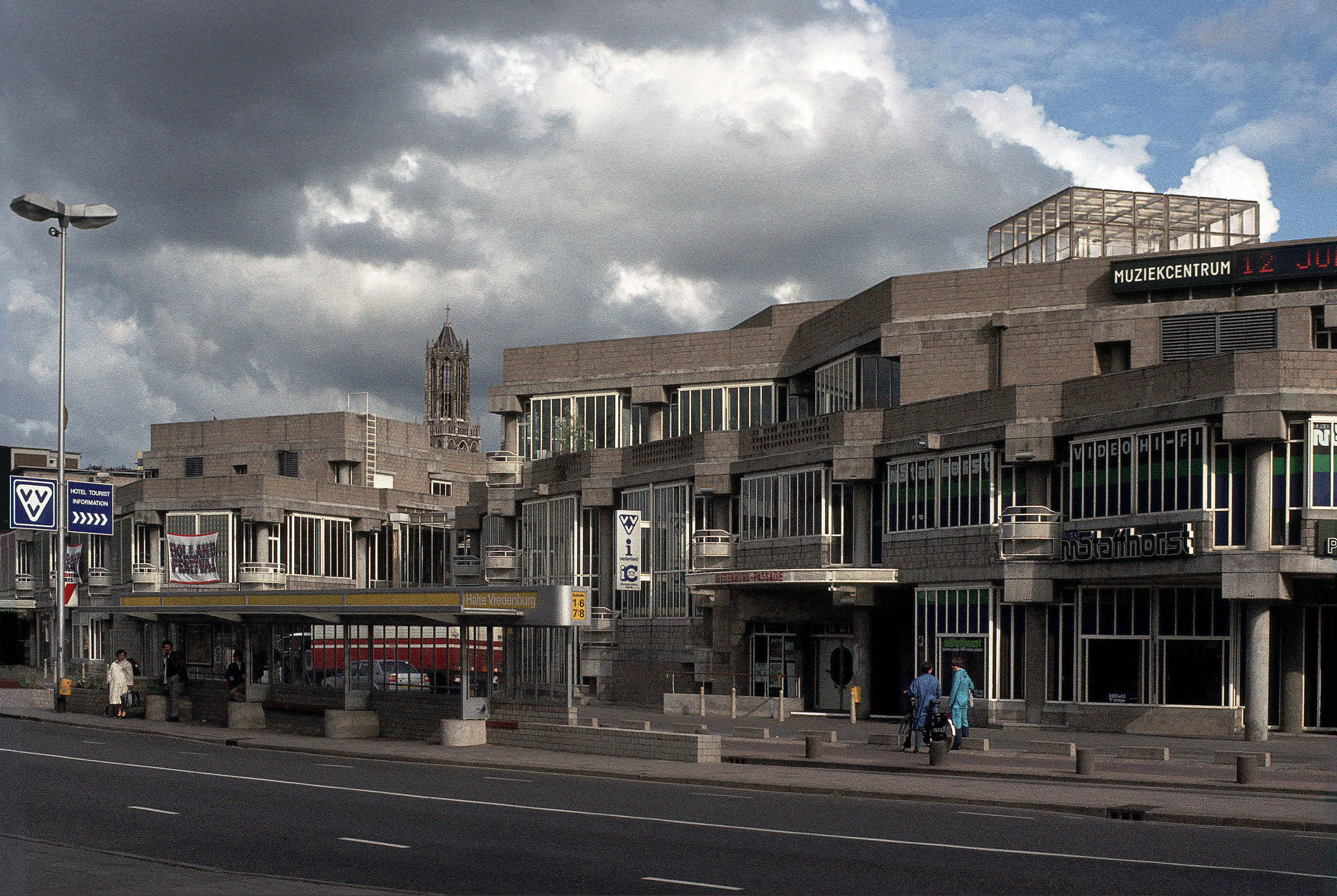
Vredenburg Music Centre in Utrecht, 1978

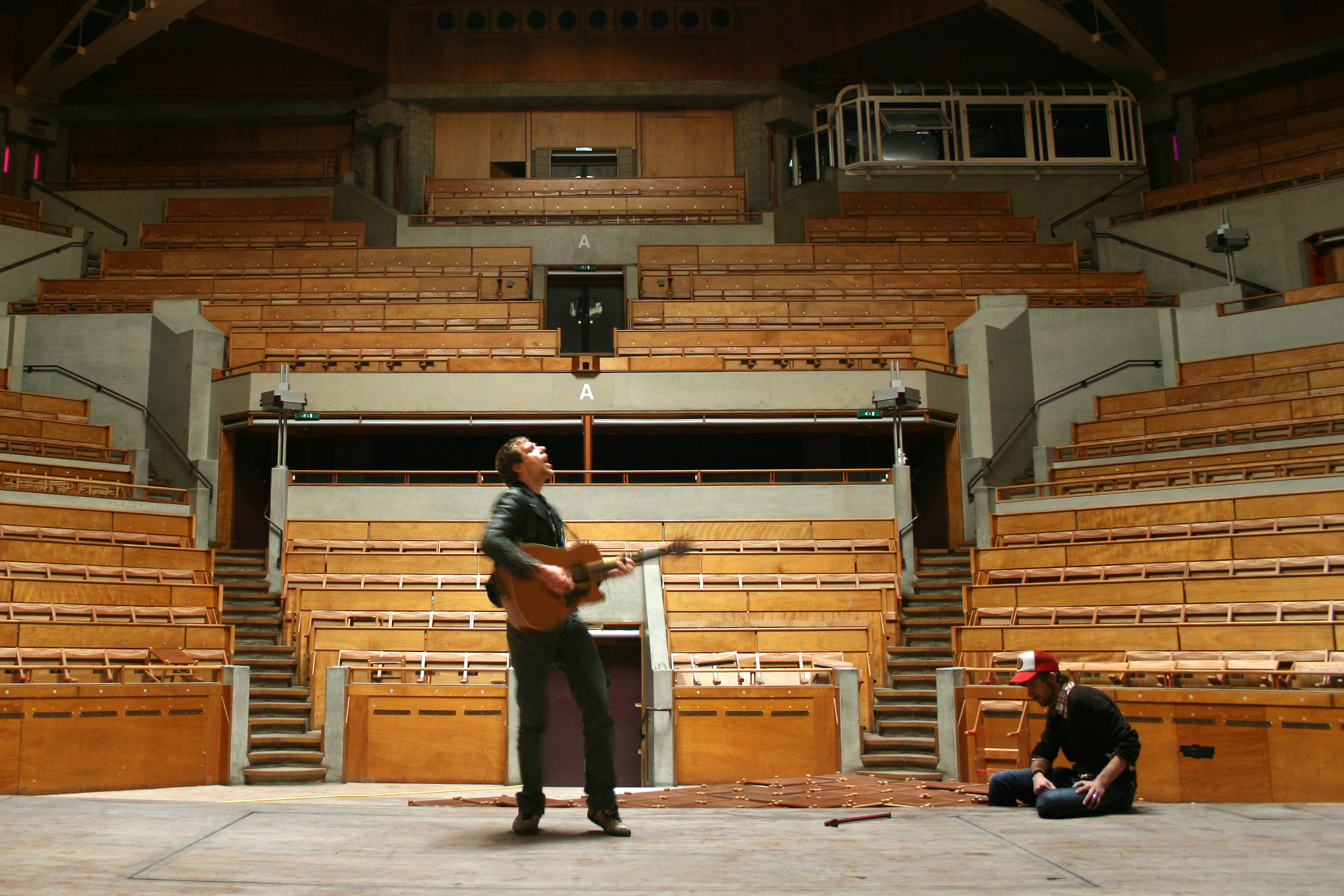
Vredenburg

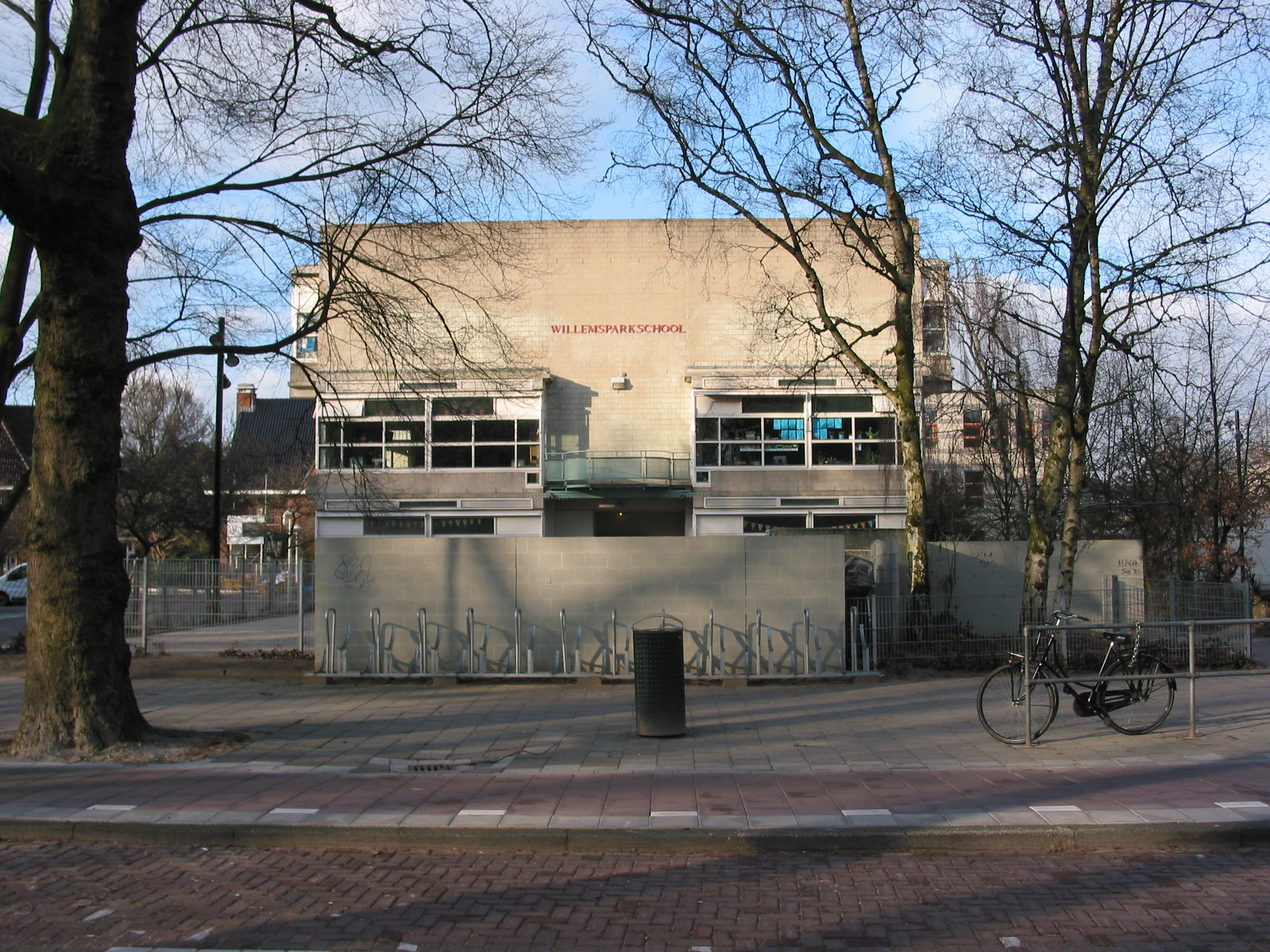
Willemspark School in Amsterdam, 1983

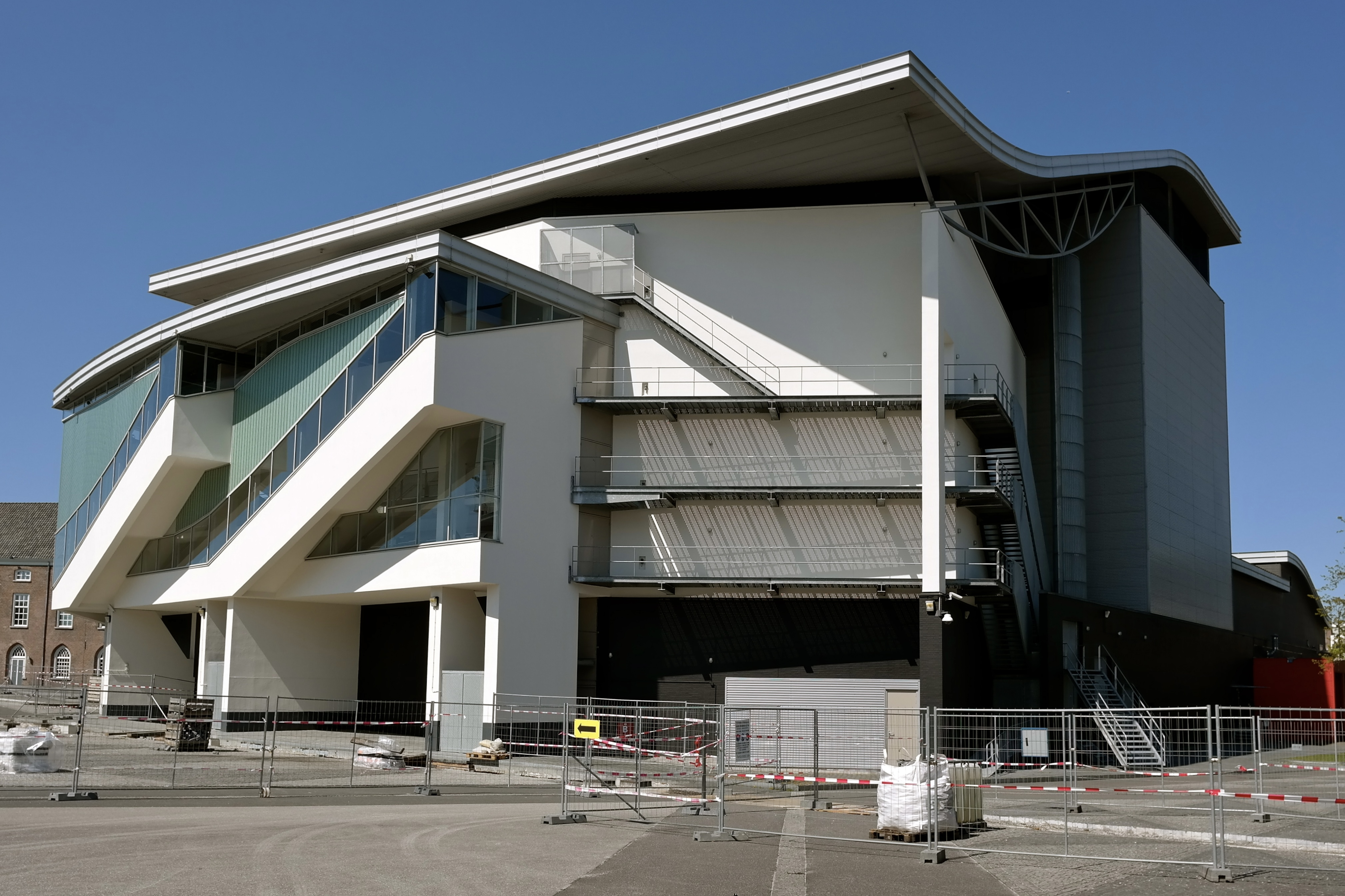
Chassé Theatre in Breda, 1995

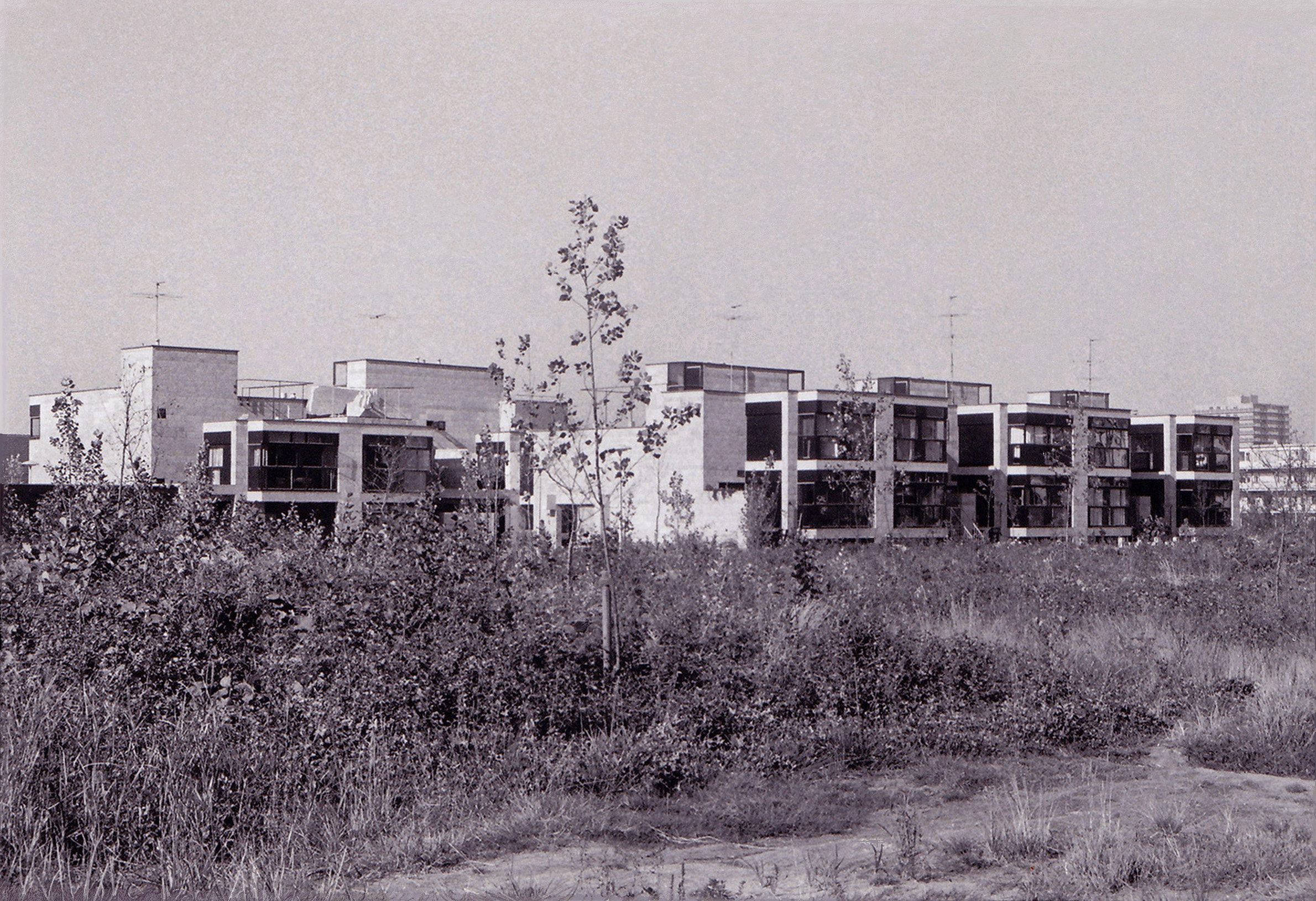
Diagoon housing in Delft, 1971

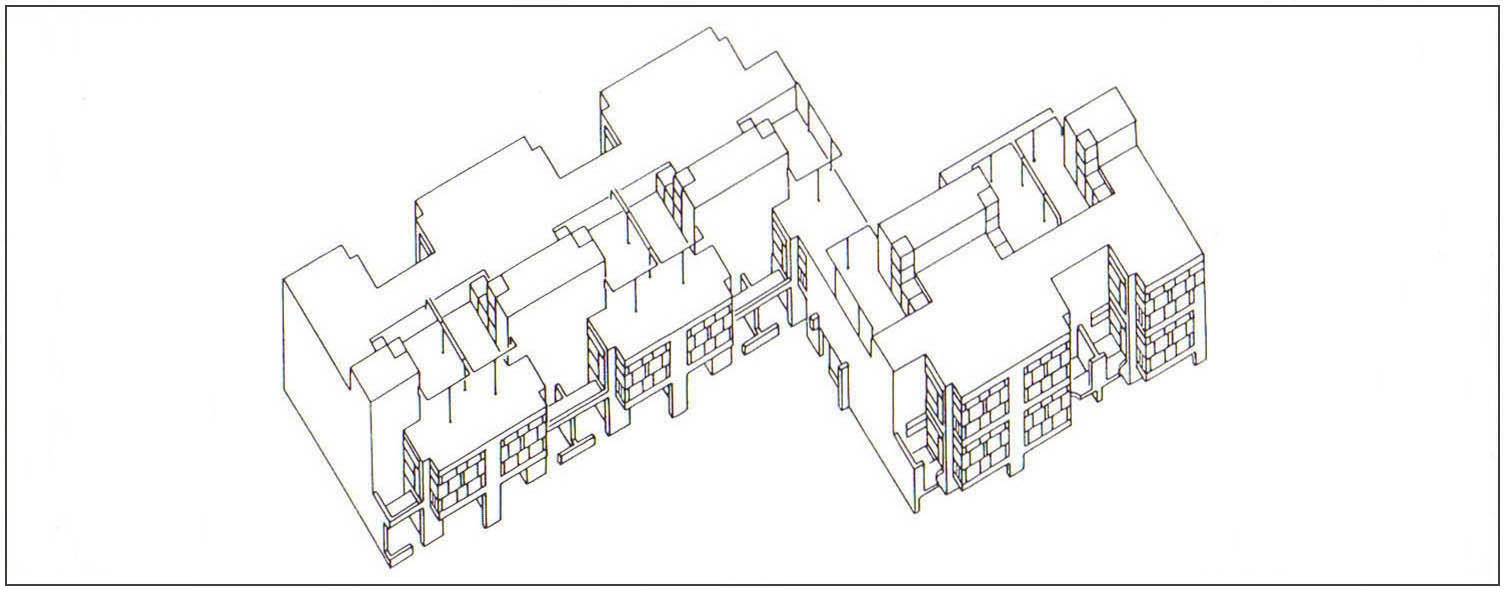
Diagoon housing, basic structure for participation

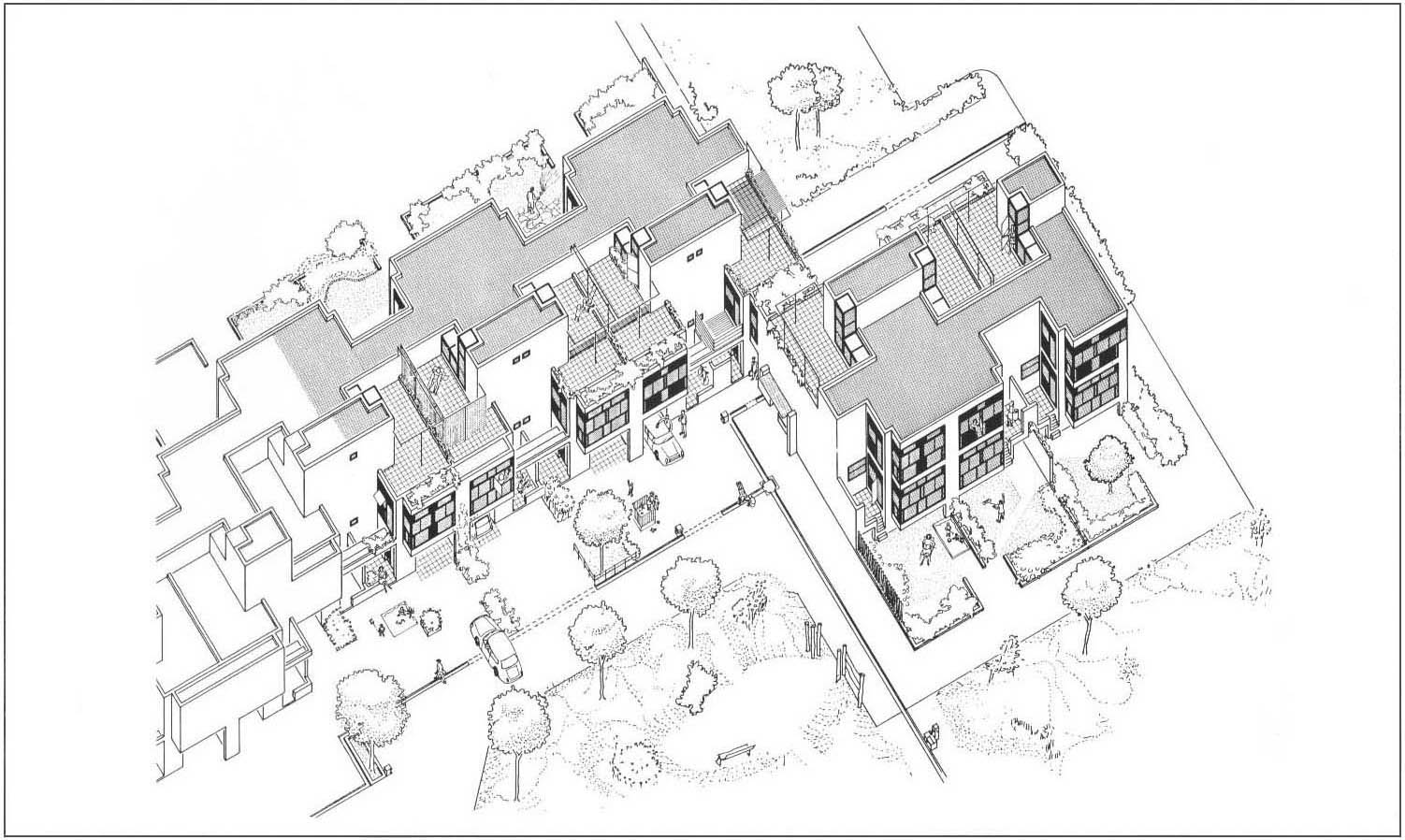
Diagoon housing, participation of the inhabitants, inside and outside
