= Nuovo Villaggio Matteotti =

Coordinates: 42.5477°N 12.6586°E

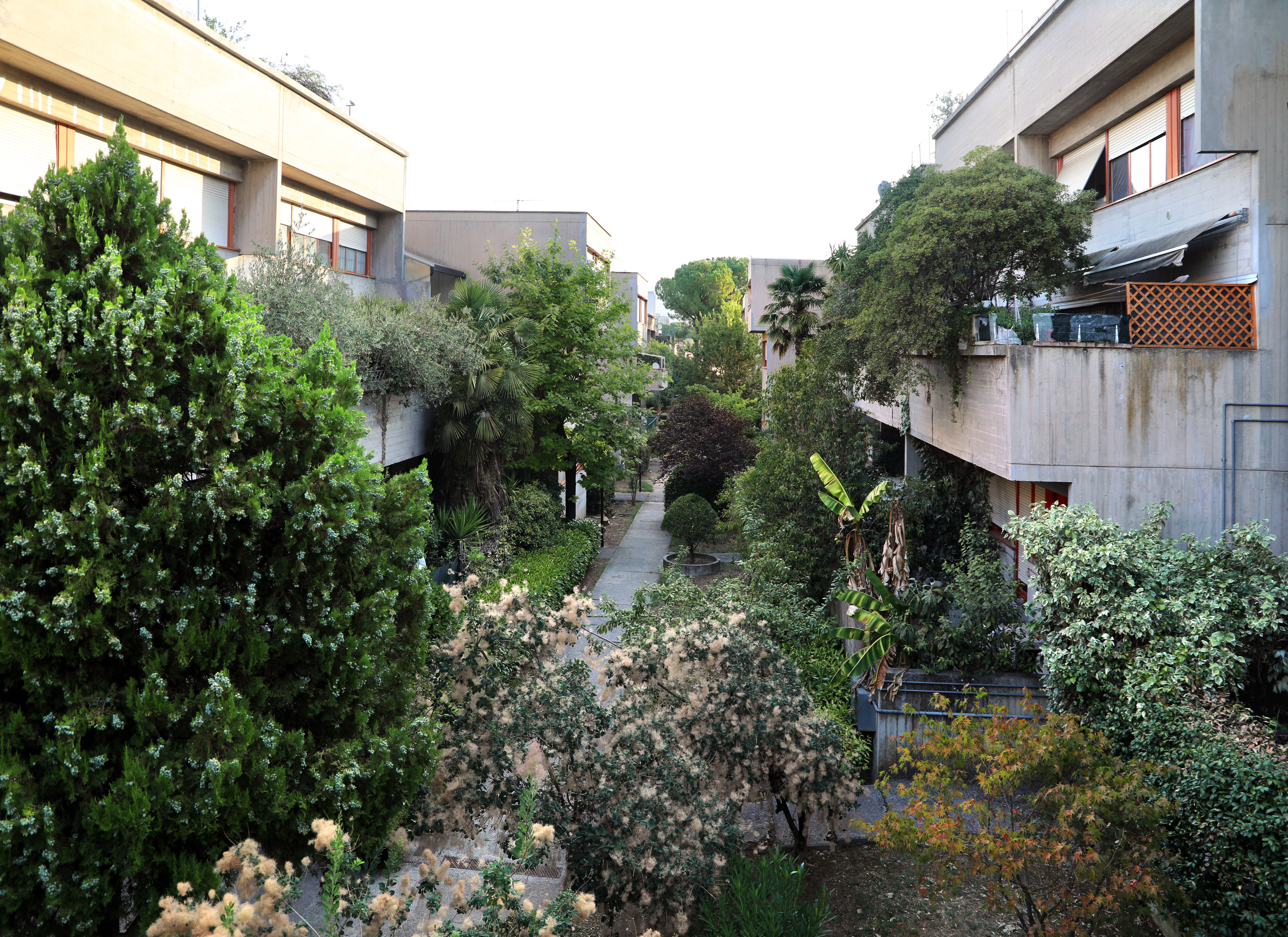
Nuovo Villagio Matteotti has private and public gardens on the terraces of the buildings.

New Matteotti Village (Nuovo Villaggio Matteotti) is a neighborhood in Terni, Italy. It was designed by the anarchist architect Giancarlo De Carlo from 1969 to 1974 to house 3,000 workers from the company Società Terni Acciaierie. Only a quarter of the original plan was constructed.

The concrete housing complex was designed after New Brutalism style. It is known for the important role of the inhabitants in the design choices, being classified as participatory design and an example of anarchist architecture. The houses differ in size and they are connected through a web of stairs, corridors and gardens.

== History ==
New Matteotti Village was commissioned as a housing complex for the 3000 workers of the steel factory Società Terni Acciaierie. Previously, the area was occupied by Italo Balbo Village, a four-family house complex built during Fascist Italy. Gianlupo Osti, the president of the company, hired the anarchist Giancarlo De Carlo as lead architect after the sociologist Domenico De Masi's advice. Others involved with the project were the engineer Vittorio Korach, sociologist Fausto Colombo and the architects Cesare De Seta and Valeria Fossati-Bellani.

Carlo and De Masi used five houses from Giulio Macchi’s Rai television show Habitat as basis for Nuovo Villaggio Matteotti. The community was deeply involved in the construction process through meetings, interviews and debates, with more than a thousand people involved. After two months of discussions, an exhibition was made at Galleria Poliantea in April–May 1970, with models from many parts of the world to educate the community about the design possibilities. The four models presented were the Siedlung Halen in Bern, Switzerland, by Atelier 5; housing complex in Kingsbury, London, by Clifford Wearden and Associates; residential complex in Ham Common, in London, by James Stirling and James Gowan; and St. Francis Square Cooperative in San Francisco by Marquisand Stoller architects. Another exhibition was held from 13 to 17 October 1973, to choose the design of the village.

The new neighborhood was partially built between 1969 and 1974. The community of the old village opposed the project and wanted to have the land rights. They involved the Catholic Church and the far-left group Lotta Continua (Continuous Struggle) into the conflict. Gianlupo Osti also left the presidency of the company, thus halting the construction efforts for good. The original project would cover 20 hectares, but only approximately a quarter was built. De Masi said in 2005 that what was built is only a "fragment of the original idea".

According to a survey conducted by researchers of the University of Perugia in June 2024, New Matteotti Village was still inhabited by the original owners and their descendants, becoming an elderly village. There were few people with no ties to the company that moved in since its creation. Despite that, most of the residents don't work for Società Terni Acciaierie anymore. The apartments also have a high cost, so many of them are inhabited for being unsold or vacant.

== Description ==
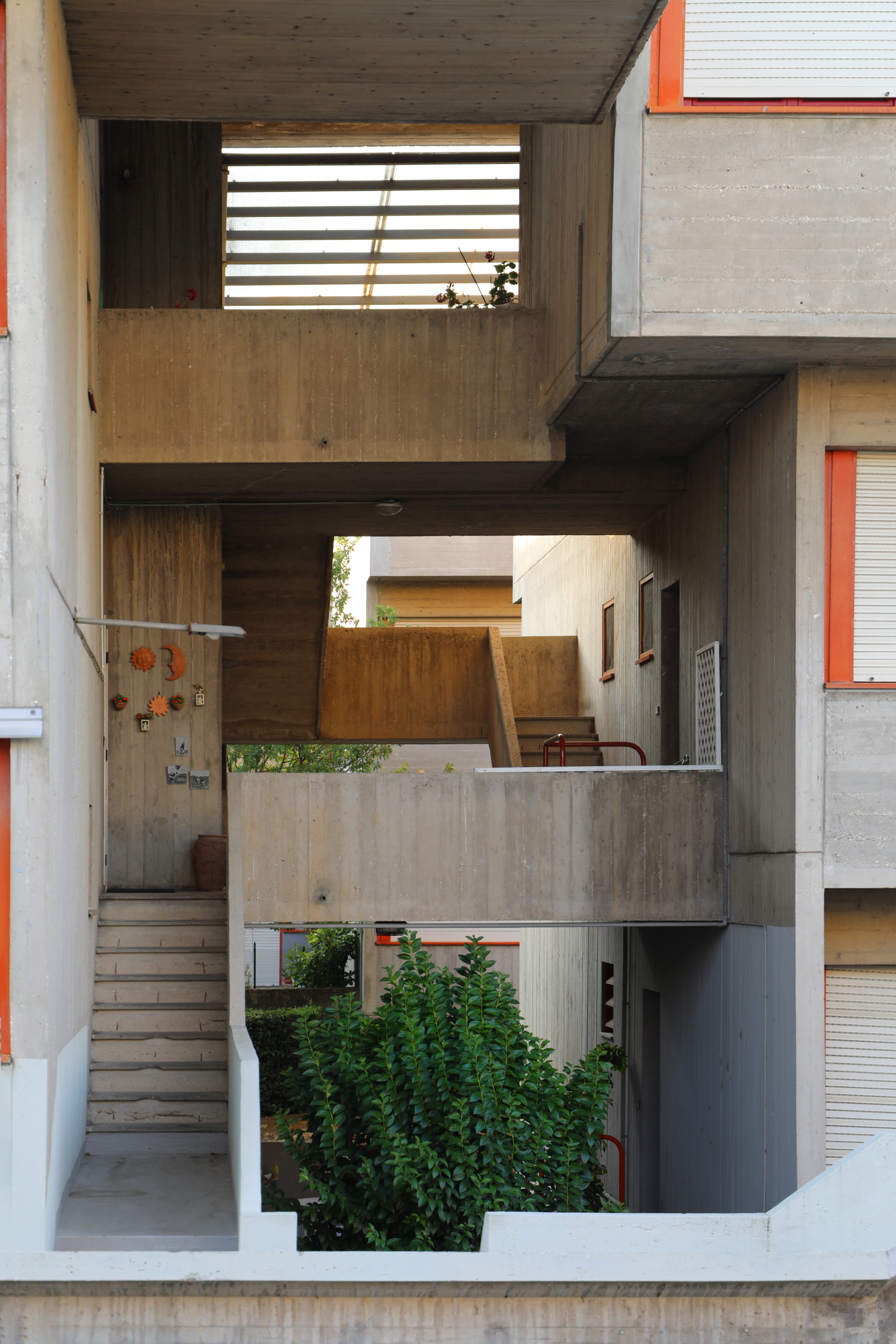
The interior of one of the houses.

New Matteotti Village was created as an answer of De Carlo to Carlo Aymonino's Monte Amiata Gallaratese housing complex in Milan, commissioned by Società Mineraria Monte Amiata as an investment in real estate speculation. The project served as testing grounds for De Carlo's theory of popular participation on the creation of the design. New Matteotti Village has been extensively studied as part of the participatory architecture, being compared with other sites, such as Ralph Erskine’s Byker Hill in Newcastle, England, and Lucien Kroll’s student housing in Louvain, Belgium.

De Carlo and sociologist De Mesi diverged on how the village was to be built. The architect wanted to impose an overall design of a low-rise, high-density village to the future inhabitants, while De Mesi wanted them to help with every aspect of the design. The workers were partially dissatisfied with the exterior design, and Carlo threatened to abandon the project. He also used the residents suggestions to design the interior spaces, but presented a limited number of options they could choose from.

The house complex has a design model called "a city in the form of a building" (una città in forma di palazzo), which was discussed by Team 10 during the meeting in Urbino in 1966. The design permits the community to interact through an intricated connection system, very similar to Quartiere Tiburtino in Rome, following the New Brutalism style.

A total of four identical concrete construction blocks with three floors and 240 apartments and a fifth one that is shorter and has an extra floor were built. The blocks have "continuous ribbon windows, often screened by overhangs or recesses, and flat roofs". The residential windows have a different set of colors to differentiate them from the commercial buildings. The design was made for the houses to be bathed with a lot of sunlight. The houses have different sizes and styles, adapted for the needs of the residents.

There are different pathways for cars and pedestrians and footbridges connecting all the blocks. The blocks are terraced, containing public and private green spaces and places for social gathering. There are a total of 45 types of terraces, often differing from each other by 150 cm. The green spaces were suggested by the workers, as most of them were ex-farmers and wanted to cultivate their own gardens. The complex also features a kindergarten, rooms for social activities and areas for commercial activities. The pathways connections were made in the final parts of the project in an "chaotic" manner, to give freedom of design to the residents.

The village wasn't designed using accessibility concepts, with the public area containing several stairs, but the residents don't perceive it as a problem. In 2024, most of the complaints were related about the decomposition of the construction materials, with problems regarding the exterior presentation, humidity, sound isolation and thermal insulation being pointed out.

== Culture ==
According to the residents, the village is quiet and pleasant, and there is a strong sense of community amongst them. Most of the households are small families.

There is a park inside New Matteotti Village, but it is considered to be unsafe and as not being part of the village. The place is a meeting point for kids.

In 2014, Centro studi Giancarlo De Carlo was created to preserve the architectural heritage of the village. It also promotes cultural projects and events and scientific projects, including research about architecture, art and history. Other important cultural organs from the village are Katiopa-Exclusive Events and Architetti all’Opera. The three of them organizes the event "Abito nell’Abitare", a fashion show "where the identity of Villaggio Matteotti and their inhabitants is expressed by the dress".

== See also ==
- List of Brutalist structures
