= Anarchist architecture =

Decentralized housing projects

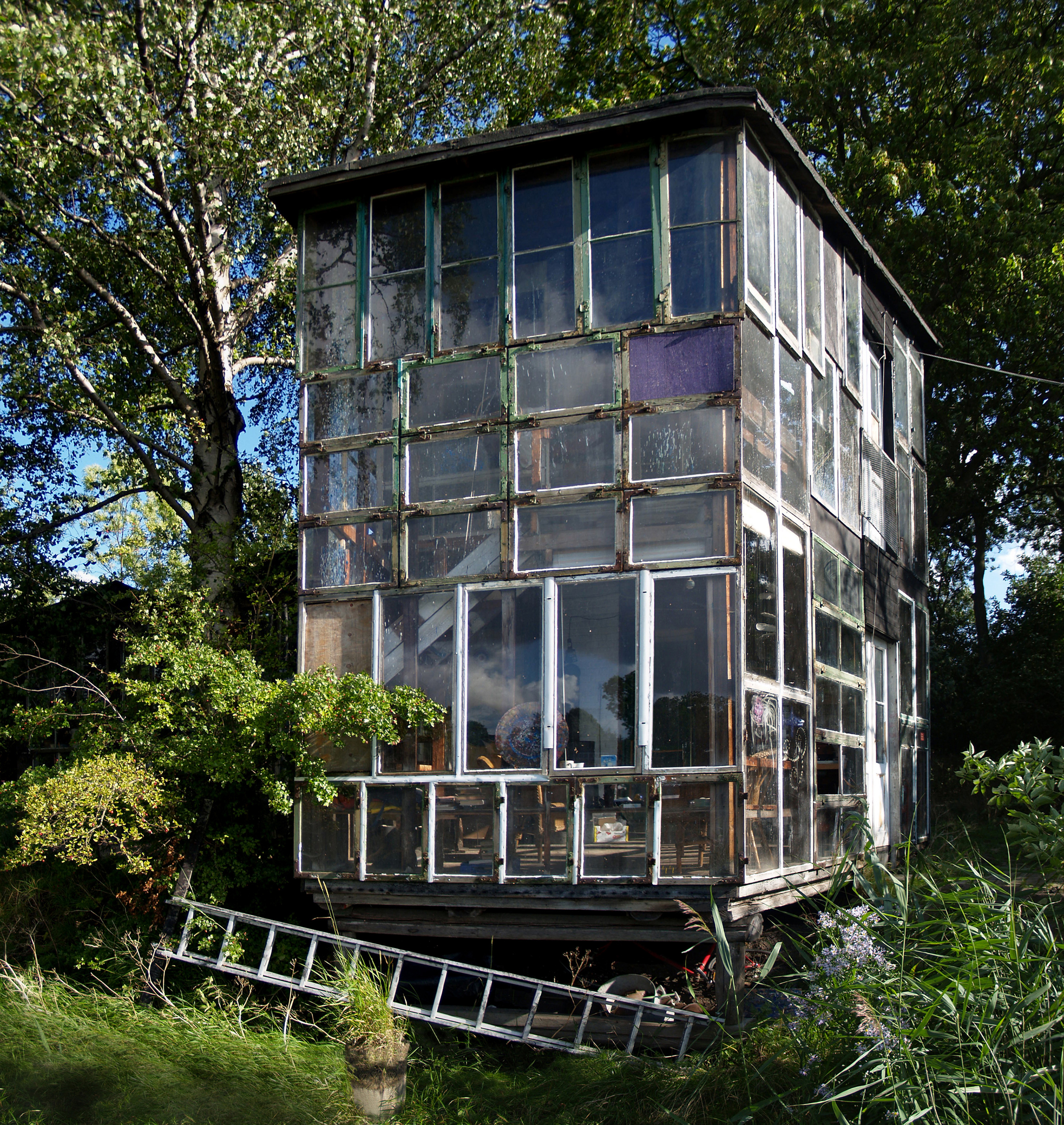
Glass house in Freetown Christiania, a squatted commune in Copenhagen.

Anarchist architecture, also known as anarchitecture, is a term used to describe architecture with anarchist intentions, or architecture by people who unconsciously follow anarchist principles such as decentralization and self-organization. According to anarchist theorists, anarchitecture should be done for the needs of individuals or small communities instead of power structures, such as capitalism or the state, like conventional architecture. Examples include housing projects and conceptual art by anarchist architects, self-built houses in informal settlements and squatted buildings modified by the inhabitants.

== Characteristics ==
Anarchist architecture starts from the premise that architecture is a political act and its main concern should be to fulfill the needs of a person or a small community instead of a power structure. It criticizes capitalist architecture, which is "increasingly commodified, sterile and elitist – part of a global capitalist system where urban space is equated with profit for a tiny few".

It differs from communist theories of housing distribution by giving responsibility to the individual instead of the government and by applying solutions readily available in the present, instead of making longer-term plans. While marxist architecture tried to overcome the division between the bourgeoisie class and the proletariat, architecture academic P. G. Raman argues, for anarchists each stratum of society, because of its peculiar history, develops different traditions of cooperation.

The book Architecture and Anarchism, by Paul Dobraszczyk, catalogued 60 projects with "forms of design and building that embrace the core values of traditional anarchist political theory". Those values are, according to Dobraszczyk, autonomy, voluntary association, mutual aid and self-organisation through direct democracy. On his book Housing: An Anarchist Approach, Colin Ward also cites the importance of informal economy and Local Exchange Trading Systems for anarchist architecture to work out.

Anarchist architecture is deeply tied to the DIY culture. The structures often borrow elements from avant-garde architecture and art.

While anarchist architecture can be performed with explicit anarchist intentions, it can also be carried out unconsciously, as a community will simply react to their living conditions without the knowledge of anarchist theory.

== History ==
The Italian anarchist architect Giancarlo De Carlo was an important figure in the development of anarchist architecture. De Carlo, who opened his office in 1950, was active in the Italian anti-fascist resistance and in the post-war anarchist movement. He saw libertarian socialism as the underlying force of his design and considered non-hierarchical participation of inhabitants as an important factor in his architecture. During the design of a housing project in the early 1970s for workers at the steel factory in Terni, De Carlo insisted that the workers were involved during the design process during working time, and that management should not be allowed to attend.

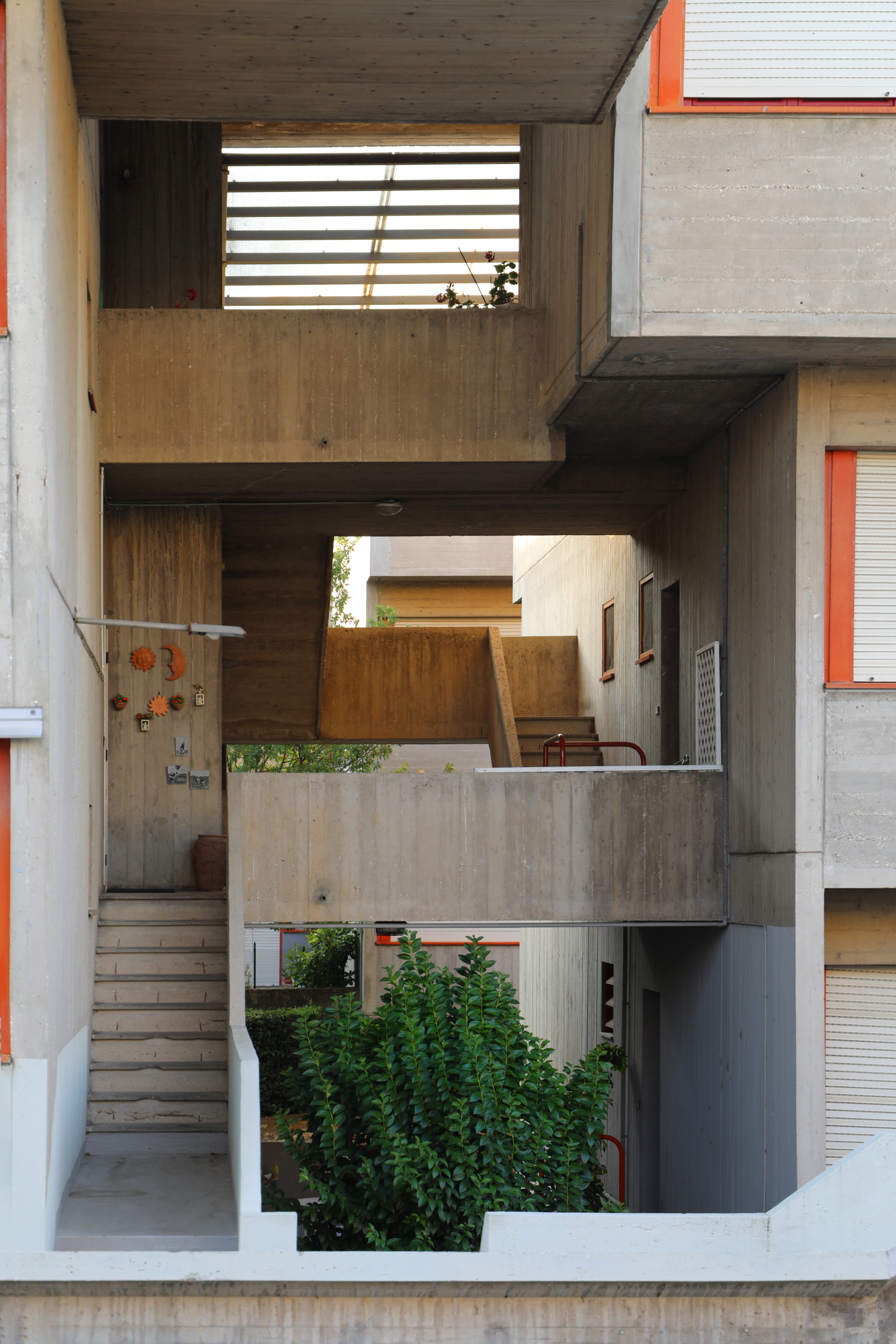
Interior of a house from New Matteotti Village, Terni.

De Carlo's participatory design was opposed to the modernist architecture of his time. He heavily criticized the functionalism of modernism, which he viewed as "too simple and unsophisticated compared with the complexity of reality". De Carlo viewed, according to architecture professor John McKean, that modernism "had succumbed to rigid bureaucratization and become formalist and prescriptive of aesthetic codes". He accused the architectural profession of surrendering to the interest of people without any principles: "The expert exploiter of building areas, the manipulator of building codes, the cultural legitimator for the sacking of the city organized by financiers, politicians and bureaucrats". He wrote in 1970 that "architecture is too important to leave to the architects" and saw participation as a process of transforming "architectural planning from the authoritarian act which it has been up to now, into a process".

The term "anarchitecture" was coined in 1974 as the title of an art exhibition by The Anarchitecture Group led by Gordon Matta-Clark, who was schooled as an architect and criticized modernist architects such as Le Corbusier. The exhibition "challenged the conventional role of architecture in society, and explored the ways in which architecture collaborates with capitalism". It attacked architecture as the symbol of modernist contemporary culture's worst excesses and drawbacks. Group member and sculptor Richard Nonas described architecture as a "hard shell", or resistance to change. The short-lived group discussed and debated spatiality, sculpture and resistance. It was described by member and avant-garde artist Laurie Anderson as "a completely literary thing".

The meaning of the term anarchitecture is "elusive, appearing to shift depending on its user", according to writer James Attlee. Matta-Clark "used the word in different contexts both before and after the show, in interviews and in his notebooks", Attlee writes. "Since his death it has become closely associated with his wider ideas about art and architecture; indeed, some would probably argue that it has been hi-jacked by those seeking to foreground their own agenda."

The term has also been used by Lebbeus Woods, whose architecture was deliberately inspired by anarchistic ideas and was made to inspire people to reinvent their way of living. Woods abandoned conventional architecture in the 1970s and devoted himself to experimental and conceptual art. While he also designed practical structures, the majority of these were never realized physically. One of his projects, the Berlin Free-Zone, designed shortly after the fall of the Berlin Wall, explored the intersection of architecture and violence. A The New York Times article described the project as "aggressive machinelike structures" of which "the interiors were designed to be difficult to inhabit – a strategy for screening out the typical bourgeois".

== Examples ==
The housing project Nuovo Villaggio Matteotti for steelworkers in the Italian town Terni was designed by architect Giancarlo De Carlo according to his anarchist principles. De Carlo included future inhabitants during the design process of the project, which was realized between 1969 and 1974. Some of the principles that characterize the design were that the buildings "must be neither fragmented nor a single block" and his conviction that "pedestrian walkways [should be] built in a scale proportioned to the individual’s psychological needs: spaces that can be immediately perceived, walkways that are both variable and inspiring, the presence of greenery, carefully chosen details”.

Squatting is considered a form of anarchist architecture, as people occupy an empty construction and modify it for their own needs. One of the best known examples is Freetown Christiania, a commune in Copenhagen that was built in 1971 in and around abandoned military buildings. Inhabitants of Christiania modified existing barracks and built their own structures in an "extraordinary diversity of styles and materials that survive to this day".

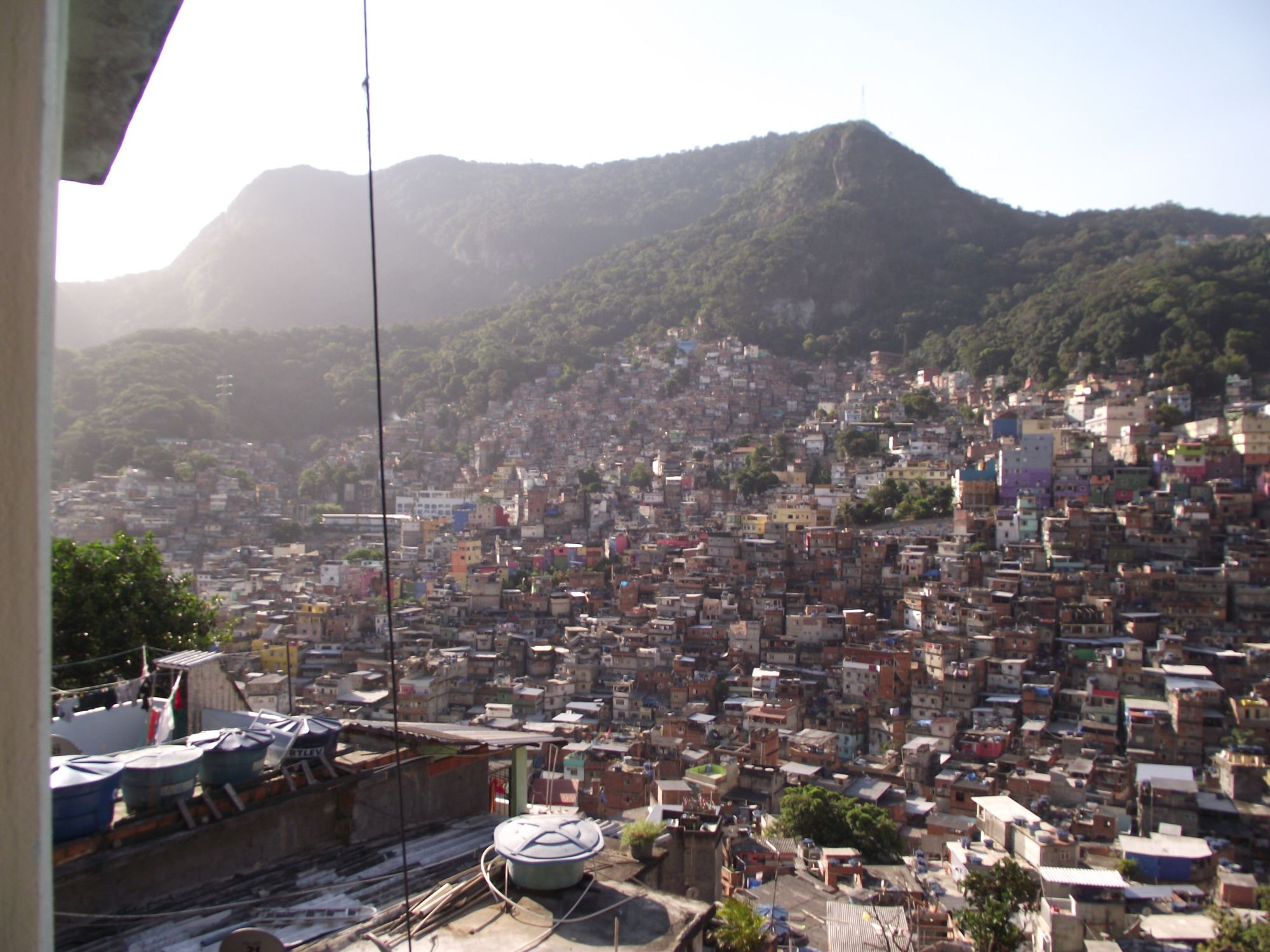
Favela da Rocinha, Rio de Janeiro.

Self built houses in informal settlements in the Global South, such as barriadas or favelas in Latin America, have been described as anarchitecture. These buildings are an illegal alternative to housing provided by governments and private companies. British anarchist architect John Turner saw such communities as an example of self reliance of workers. Turner described informal settlements as "architecture that worked" and advocated that the inhabitants of such settlements should be free to produce homes and social spaces for themselves.

Another example of anarchist architecture is the tents and makeshift buildings during activist occupations, such as during the Occupy movement. Activists across the world built camps to occupy public spaces and protest against economic injustice. Refugees or displaced people who are forced to build improvised housing in semi-permanent camps could also be described as anarchitecture.

Building cooperatives where people work together to construct houses could be considered as anarchitecture. British-Asian and West-African communities in the United Kingdom created housing cooperatives during the 1960s, where individuals would pay to join, take a loan from a fund and pay it back with no interest as a way to fund the construction of their houses.

Some associations, such as the South London Housing Association (SOLON), were created with the objective of remodeling pre-existing houses. They became more active after the Housing Act (1974), that raised the funding for housing cooperatives in London. SOLON "was run on worker co-operative collectivist principles", where even the tenants were part of the association. In SOLON's case, even though the tenant had a lot to say about the reformations, the final decisions were made by the architect and the owner of the property.

In some cases, associations were created to disrupt government building efforts, such as the Architects' Revolutionary Council (ARC), created in 1974. Led by Brian Anson, it had the objective of destroying the architectural establishment from England, specially RIBA, and invited architects to work directly for the population. ARC constantly interfered with RIBA's demolishing activities.

== Anarchitecture architects ==
- Giancarlo De Carlo
- Walter Segal
- John F. C. Turner
- Charles Jencks
- Gordon Matta-Clark
- Lebbeus Woods
- Hassan Fathy
