= Alex Gil =

Alex Gil may refer to:

- Alex Gil (scholar) (born 1973), scholar of digital humanities and Caribbean studies
- Alex Gil (architect) (born 1977), New York-based architect
