= Pesaro Courthouse =

Judiciary building in Pesaro, Italy

- Interactive map of the Pesaro Courthouse area

General information
- Type: Courthouse
- Location: Pesaro, Marche, Italy
- Coordinates: 43°54′20.2″N 12°54′47.8″E
- Construction started: 2002
- Completed: 2005
- Inaugurated: March 2006; 20 years ago
- Cost: €15.7 million

Design and construction
- Architects: Giancarlo De Carlo, Monica Mazzolani
- Structural engineer: Massimo Majowiecki, Ernesto Olmeda

The Pesaro Courthouse (Palazzo di Giustizia) is a judicial complex located on Piazzale Giosuè Carducci in Pesaro, Italy.

== History ==
The new courthouse in Pesaro was designed between 2000 and 2002 and built from 2002 to 2005. It was developed by architect Giancarlo De Carlo with Monica Mazzolani, also in collaboration with Francesco De Agostini and Danilo Marcone. Structural engineering was carried out by Massimo Majowiecki for the steel structures, and Ernesto Olmeda for the reinforced concrete elements.

The building is located on the city's periphery, in an area dominated by railways and major roadways. In response to this anonymous and fragmented context, De Carlo designed a compact and self-contained volume, offering spatial clarity and functional autonomy suited to judicial activities.

Works were carried out by the Carducci company, with a total cost of €15.7 million. Inauguration took place in early March 2006.

== Description ==
The building presents itself as a rigid and geometric structure, organized around a square plan with a central courtyard. The external façades are clad in modular terracotta panels, reinforcing a sense of order and compactness.

At the core of the composition is a green courtyard, invisible from the outside and illuminated by a central skylight cone that channels natural light into the interior. This vertical void defines the spatial hierarchy of the building, with circulation galleries on all four sides.

The main entrance, accessed via a monumental staircase carved into the building's mass, leads to an elevated platform offering immediate spatial orientation. A secondary entrance on the opposite side connects to a lower level and opens onto a small inner garden, characterized by stone and cacti elements.

== Sources ==
- Ciccarelli, Lorenzo (2016). Guida all'architettura nelle Marche 1900-2015. Macerata: Quodlibet. pp. 50–51.
- Fuligna, Tiziana (2005). "Palazzo di Giustizia. Pesaro". Area. No. 8. Florence. pp. 48–57.
- Mazzolani, Monica (2005). ll palazzo di giustizia di Pesaro. Milan: Motta.
