= San Miniato, Siena =

San Miniato
- Neighbourhood
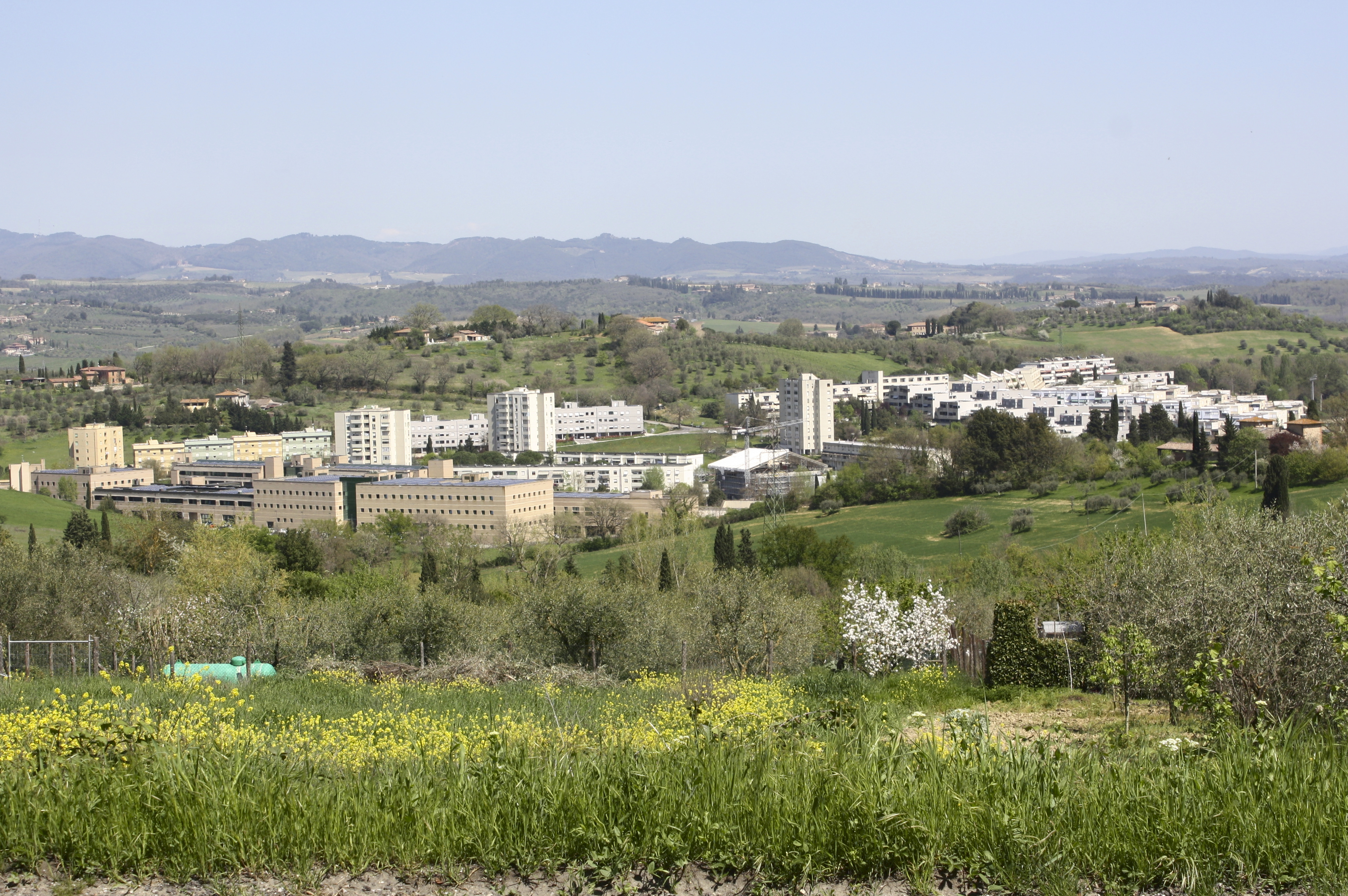
- Interactive map of San Miniato
- Coordinates: 43°20′49.38″N 11°19′31.98″E
- Country: Italy
- Region: Tuscany
- Province: Siena
- Comune: Siena

Population (2020)
  - Total: 2,600
- Time zone: UTC+1 (CET)
  - Summer (DST): UTC+2 (CEST)

San Miniato is a neighborhood located north of the historic centre of Siena, Tuscany. Originally a rural settlement with medieval origins, it was extensively redeveloped in the 1970s and 1980s as part of an ambitious urban plan by architect Giancarlo De Carlo, aiming to integrate contemporary architecture within the city's historic landscape. Today, although primarily residential, the district is home to important academic and healthcare institutions.

== History ==
In 998, the Diocese of Florence acquired the jus patronatus of the church of San Bartolomeo in Camollia and a parcel of land on the Tolfe hill, located between the Bozzone and Bolgione streams. In the early 11th century, this land was entrusted to the monks of San Miniato al Monte in Florence. The foundation of the church of San Miniato―known as San Miniato a Noceto―spurred the development of a small rural settlement, which later became a jus patronatus of the Sienese monastery of Sant'Eugenio.

By the 13th century, San Miniato a Noceto was already documented as a comunello—the smallest administrative unit—of the Republic of Siena. During the mid-16th century War of Siena, the area was ravaged by imperial troops, who destroyed the nearby castle of Le Tolfe but spared the church. However, the village remained largely depopulated, and its ecclesiastical jurisdiction shifted several times: to Pontignano in 1575, to San Martino di Cellole in 1613, and finally to Le Tolfe in 1787.

In the 1970s and 1980s, the area underwent extensive urbanization, marked by the construction of a modern residential district designed by architect Giancarlo De Carlo. The project included public housing and major civic institutions, such as the Santa Maria alle Scotte hospital, the University's science campus, and the office complex of Banca Monte dei Paschi di Siena.

De Carlo envisioned a neighborhood that integrated harmoniously with Siena's unique medieval landscape, "a fan-shaped arrangement of housing nestled in greenery, descending along the contours typical of medieval settlements". However, the execution of the project diverged significantly from De Carlo's vision due to political compromises and administrative decisions. As a result, De Carlo publicly disowned the built version, criticizing the "distortions introduced by the opportunism of the municipal administration". Parallel plans by architect Giovanni Michelucci, including a church and a civic center, were never realized, partly due to changes in political direction and partly because Michelucci himself distanced from the project amid concerns about its overall coherence.

Over time, the neighborhood faced increasing physical degradation and social challenges, particularly due to the absence of the integrated services that were originally planned to support community life. A first attempt at revitalization failed, prompting the launch of the Contratto di Quartiere per San Miniato, a government-funded urban renewal program initiated in 1998 under mayor Pierluigi Piccini, with funding of around 14.5 billion lire from the Ministry of Public Works. Despite interventions carried out between 2002 and 2004, the program was never fully completed and failed to resolve the persistent issues of structural decline and social marginalization.

According to Mariotti (2023), San Miniato represents "the most significant suburban development project in Siena's twentieth-century history", yet it nonetheless "leaves a sense of estrangement because it stands in stark contrast to the energy of the place".

== Main sights ==
=== Church of Corpus Domini ===
Located between Via Aldo Moro and Via Palmiro Togliatti, the Corpus Domini parish church was designed by architect Augusto Mazzini and completed in 1994. Though the parish is named after San Miniato, the church was dedicated to the Corpus Domini by Archbishop Gaetano Bonicelli, in memory of the 22nd National Eucharistic Congress held in Siena in May 1994. It is regarded as a notable example of contemporary sacred architecture.

=== Former church of San Miniato a Noceto ===
Just outside the urban area lies the former church of San Miniato a Noceto—the oldest building in the district, dating back to the 11th century and historically known as San Miniato Vecchio. Originally founded by the monks of San Miniato al Monte, it served as a parish church until its suppression in 1787, after which it was deconsecrated and sold into private ownership. Although altered for use as storage, its Romanesque features—especially the well-preserved apse—remain visible.

== Education ==
San Miniato hosts the University of Siena's Scientific Campus on Via Aldo Moro, home to the departments of biotechnology, chemistry and pharmacy, life sciences, and molecular and developmental medicine. Since 2001, it has also housed the Leonetto Comparini Anatomical Museum, which features historical anatomical specimens, wax models, and instruments.

The area includes the University Sports Center, designed by De Carlo and completed in 2005, and the Enrico De Nicola Student Residence, built between 1995 and 2001, designed by Carlo Nepi, Mario Rodolfo Terrosi, and Giuliano Manganelli.

== Healthcare ==
The Santa Maria alle Scotte Hospital is home to the Siena University Hospital (Azienda Ospedaliero-Universitaria Senese), which hosts several academic departments, including the Department of Medical Biotechnology, the Department of Medical, Surgical and Neurosciences, and part of the Department of Molecular Medicine. It is one of the three major hospitals in Tuscany.

== Sources ==
- Aleardi, Andrea; Marcetti, Corrado (2011). L'architettura in Toscana dal 1945 a oggi. Una guida alla selezione delle opere di rilevante interesse storico-artistico. Florence: Alinea.
- Dulio, Roberto (2017). Giovanni Michelucci e la sede della contrada di Valdimontone a Siena 1974-1997. Milan: Mondadori Electa.
- Maggi, Stefano (2021). "Siena: periferia e qualità della vita nel Novecento" (PDF). In Andrea Maria Locatelli; Claudio Besana; Nicola Martinelli (eds.). Periferie europee. Istituzioni sociali, politiche, luoghi: una prospettiva storica. Vol. 1. Milan: Franco Angeli.
- Mariotti, Walter (31 May 2023). "Viaggio in Italia: Quando Siena si fece Nova dimenticando il genius loci". Domus.
- Repetti, Emanuele (1839). "Noceto (San Miniato a)". Dizionario geografico fisico storico della Toscana. Vol. 3. Florence. p. 646.
