= Alex Gil (architect) =

American architect

- Education: The Cooper Union (B. Arch., 2001); Harvard Graduate School of Design (M.Arch., 2004)
- Occupation: Architect
- Practice: SPACECUTTER

Alex Gil (born December 24, 1977) is a New York-based architect, and Principal of SPACECUTTER, which he founded in 2009. Among his notable works are the award-winning Cut Triplex house and the Carved Duplex penthouse and roof addition.

== Education and early career ==
Gil holds a Master of Architecture degree from Harvard University's Graduate School of Design and a Bachelor of Architecture from the Irwin S. Chanin School of Architecture at The Cooper Union. Gil was presented the Alpha Rho Chi medal for leadership, service and merit upon graduation in 2001.

Gil is a registered architect in New York, Illinois and Florida.

Early in his career, Alex Gil collaborated with the experimental architect Lebbeus Woods on the installation The Storm, a gallery work of drawings, architectonic elements, and suspended high-tensile cables. The installation, which was realized for the Arthur A. Houghton Jr. Gallery at The Cooper Union, is documented in the exhibition materials and in the published volume The Storm & The Fall, where the project credits list “Concept & Design: Lebbeus Woods” and “Design & Construction: Alexander Gil.”

== Work ==
Gil is principal of SPACECUTTER, which he founded in 2009. Gil is a registered architect in New York and Illinois.

Architectural Digest has noted that Gil’s understanding of urban contexts and his experience with strict code requirements inform his approach to residential design, leading to projects that explore unconventional uses of sites, structures, and materials.

=== Notable projects ===
In 2011, SPACECUTTER completed the Carved Duplex, a renovation of a Brooklyn townhouse, which added a roof addition with a deck, clad in Cor-Ten steel panels. The residence was included in the 2015 Dwell Home Tours.

In 2016, SPACECUTTER completed the 5,300-square foot Cut Triplex townhouse in Chicago. The house was designed to balance privacy and openness on a narrow alley-facing lot. The project has won a 2018 Iconic Award for Innovative Architecture by the German Design Council. It also received a Residential Award of Citation from the AIA New York State in 2018.

=== Furniture and design objects ===
Gil and SPACECUTTER have designed a number of furniture pieces and custom design objects. The Wedge Desk was a finalist at the LIVE WORK Design Contest, organized by Design Within Reach and Dwell Magazine in 2012.

In 2012, he designed Monolith Table, an 11-foot long red cedar dining table, which Gil describes as inspired by 2001: A Space Odyssey. The table was selected for BOFFO Show House's Experiment in Living in 2012 and was presented in New York's International Contemporary Furniture Fair in 2013.

== Select exhibitions ==
- 2016-2017 — 5x5: Participatory Provocations (Diplomat's Tower)
- 2013 — International Contemporary Furniture Fair (Monolith Table)
- 2012 — BOFFO Show House: Experiment in Living (Monolith Table and Corner Table)
- 2012 — LIVE WORK Design Contest, Design Within Reach and Dwell Magazine (Wedge Desk).
