= Halen Estate =

Coordinates: 46°58′21.49″N 7°24′47.25″E

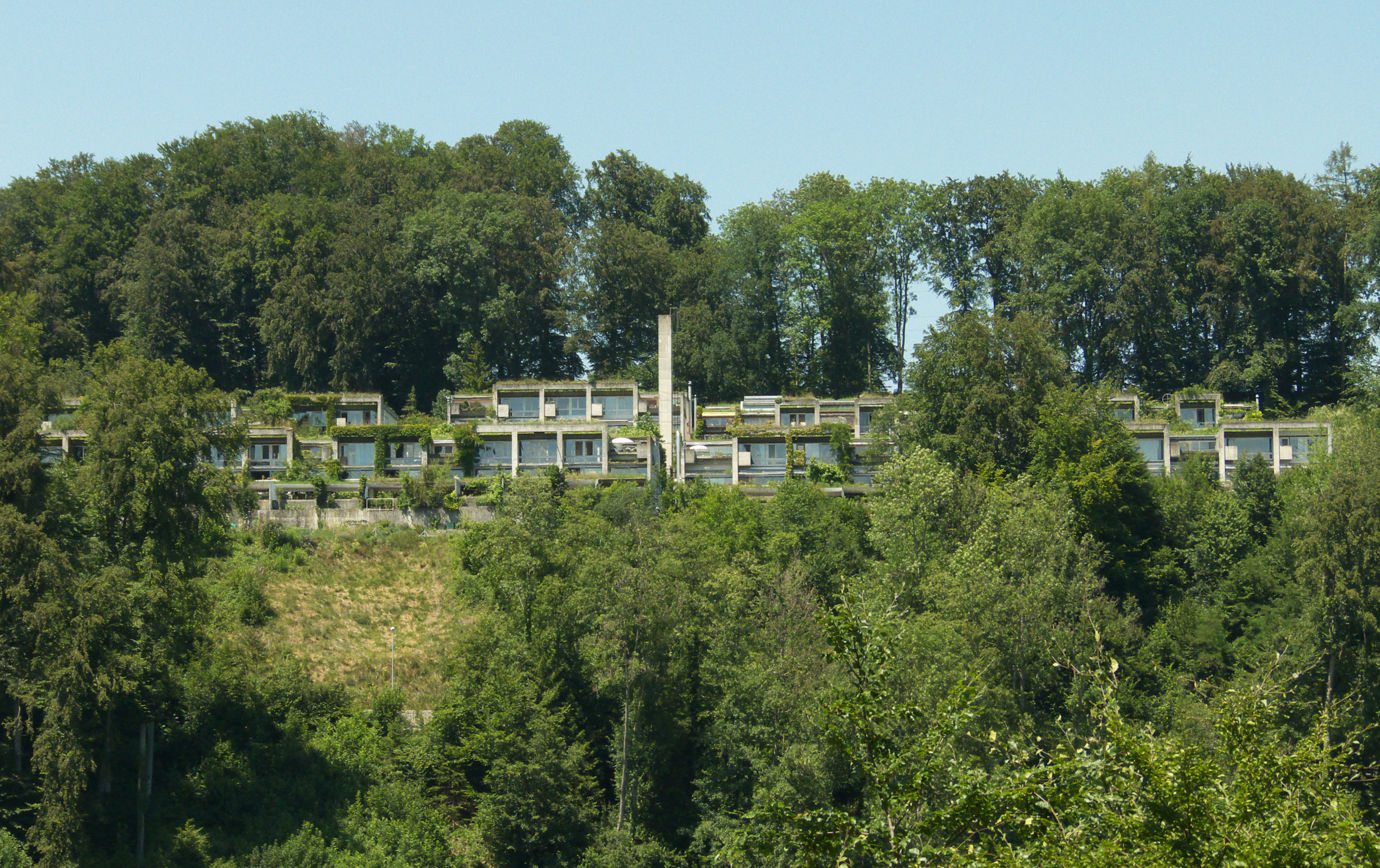
Halen Estate, south side

The Halen Estate (Siedlung Halen) is a housing development near Berne, Switzerland. It was designed and built by the Atelier 5 architectural partnership from 1957 to 1961. Located in a wooded area north of the city, the development is an important example of 20th century Modernist architecture (Structuralism), and as such is listed on the Inventory of Swiss Heritage Sites.

== Description ==
Halen Estate comprises 82 privately owned houses arranged in three terraces. Built on a hillside, the terraces are reminiscent of steps. The development, quite dense, is also home to a swimming pool and other communal amenities. Most of the buildings are large 3,80m and presents three different levels organized in different cases. The southern part has a ground floor with garden and one bedroom, on the mid level (looking to the common area of the main street) there is the living area, then there is the third level where again we find one bedroom and services.
