= Giancarlo De Carlo =

Italian architect (1919–2005)

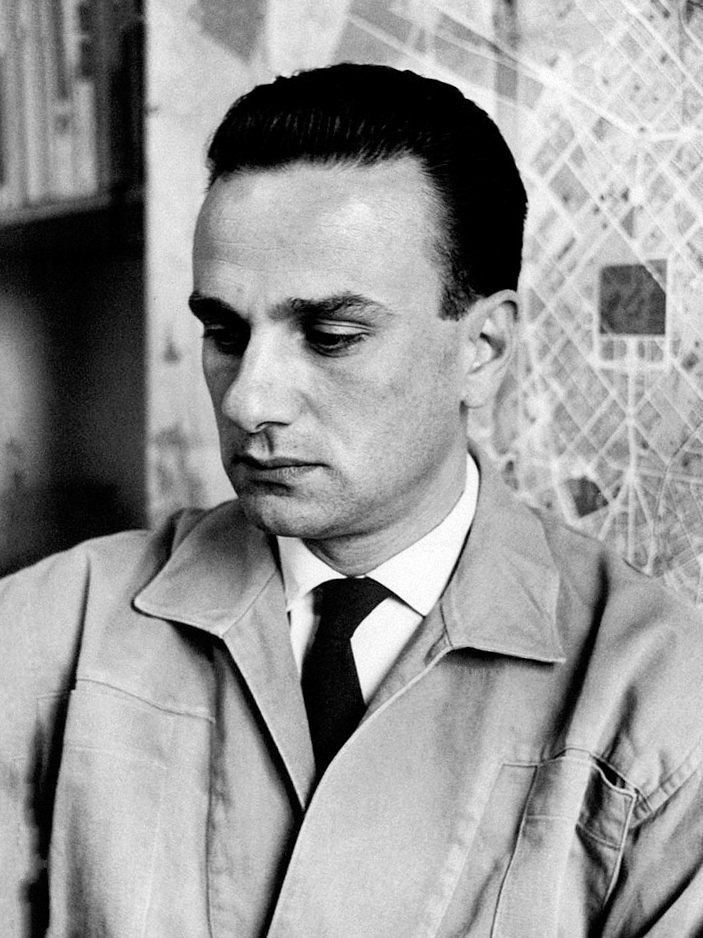
- Giancarlo De Carlo in the 1950s
- Born: 12 December 1919; Genoa, Kingdom of Italy
- Died: 4 June 2005 (aged 85); Milan, Italy
- Occupation: Architect

Giancarlo De Carlo (12 December 1919 − 4 June 2005) was an Italian architect. He was a member of the Congrès Internationaux d'Architecture Moderne (CIAM) and became closely linked to Urbino as its town planner and creator of its master plan. Throughout his architecture career, he advocated for the consideration of human, physical, cultural, and historical forces in design. His son is Andrea De Carlo.

== Biography ==
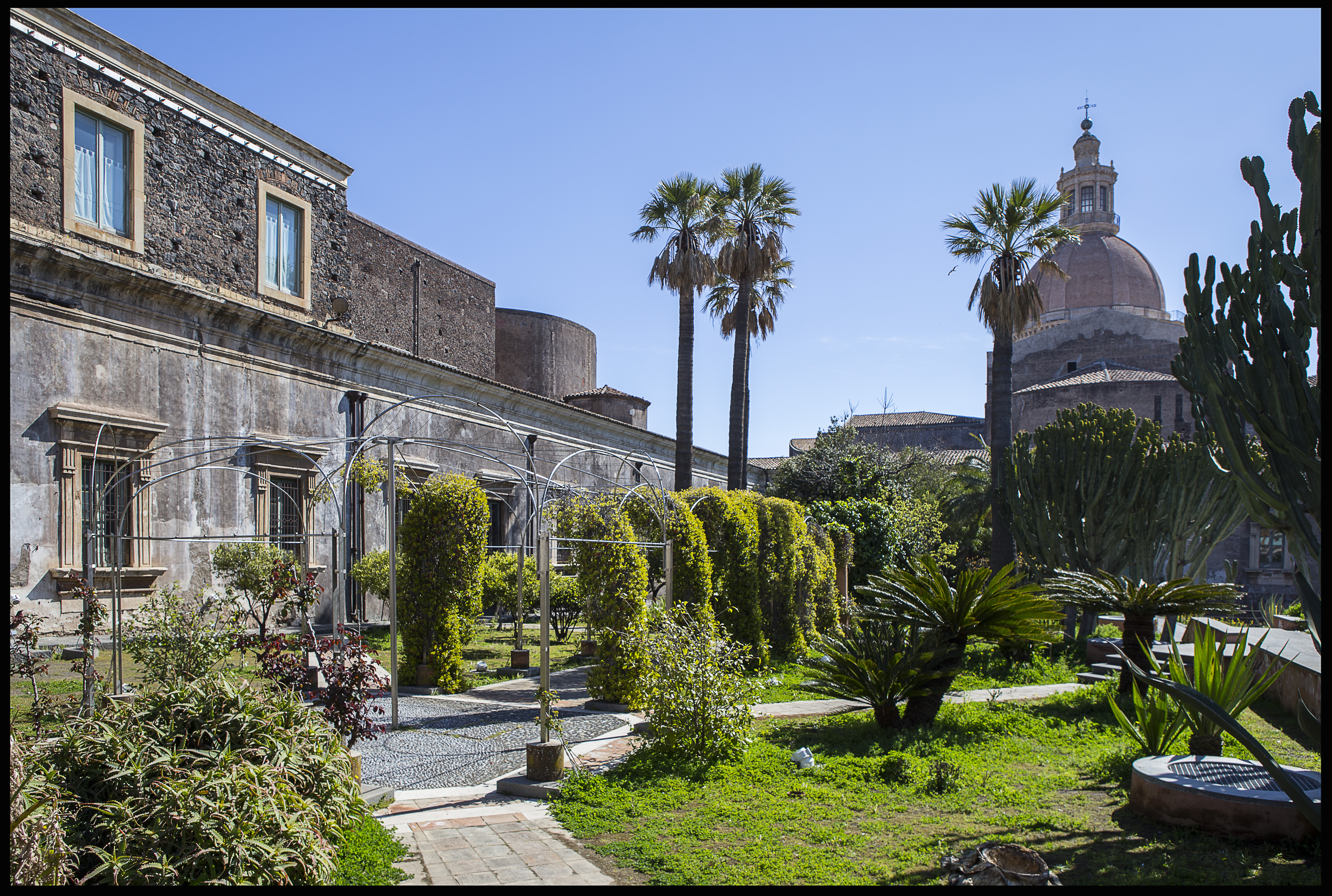
"Garden of Novices" (Monastery of San Nicolò l'Arena)

Giancarlo De Carlo was born in Genoa, Liguria in 1919 of a Tunisian father and Chilean mother. He enrolled at the Polytechnic University of Milan in 1939 and graduated with a degree in engineering in 1943. He then enlisted as a naval officer in World War II and served on a submarine support ship in the Mediterranean Sea. Following Italy's surrender to the Allied forces on 8 September 1943, he went into hiding, participating in the Italian Resistance through the Movement of Proletarian Unity alongside other Milanese architects such as Franco Albini. Later, De Carlo and fellow architect Giuseppe Pagano organized an anarchist-libertarian partisan group in Milan, the Matteotti Brigades.

In 1948, De Carlo resumed his studies at the Istituto Universitario di Architettura di Venezia (Università Iuav di Venezia), where he received his degree in architecture on 1 August 1949.

In 1956, as an Italian member of the Congrès Internationaux d'Architecture Moderne (CIAM), De Carlo presented his own project for a housing complex in Matera in which all the principles of Le Corbusier are ignored at the expense of specific attention to the geographical, social and climatic context of the region. His ideas broke from the old generation of architects and the international architectural model. In 1956, the current CIAM congress concluded and Team 10 began, bringing together a new generation of architects (including De Carlo, Alison and Peter Smithson, Aldo van Eyck, and Jacob "Jaap" Bakema) to conceive a new type of architecture, one which was better suited to local social and environmental conditions and where the man "is not reduced to an abstract figure".

De Carlo became closely linked with Urbino, becoming its town planner in 1958 and creating a master plan for the city.

Libertarian socialism was the underlying force for all of De Carlo's planning and design. He saw architecture as a consensus-based activity: his designs were generated as an expression of the forces that operate in a given context, including human, physical, cultural, and historical forces. His ideas linked the CIAM ideals with the late twentieth-century reality.

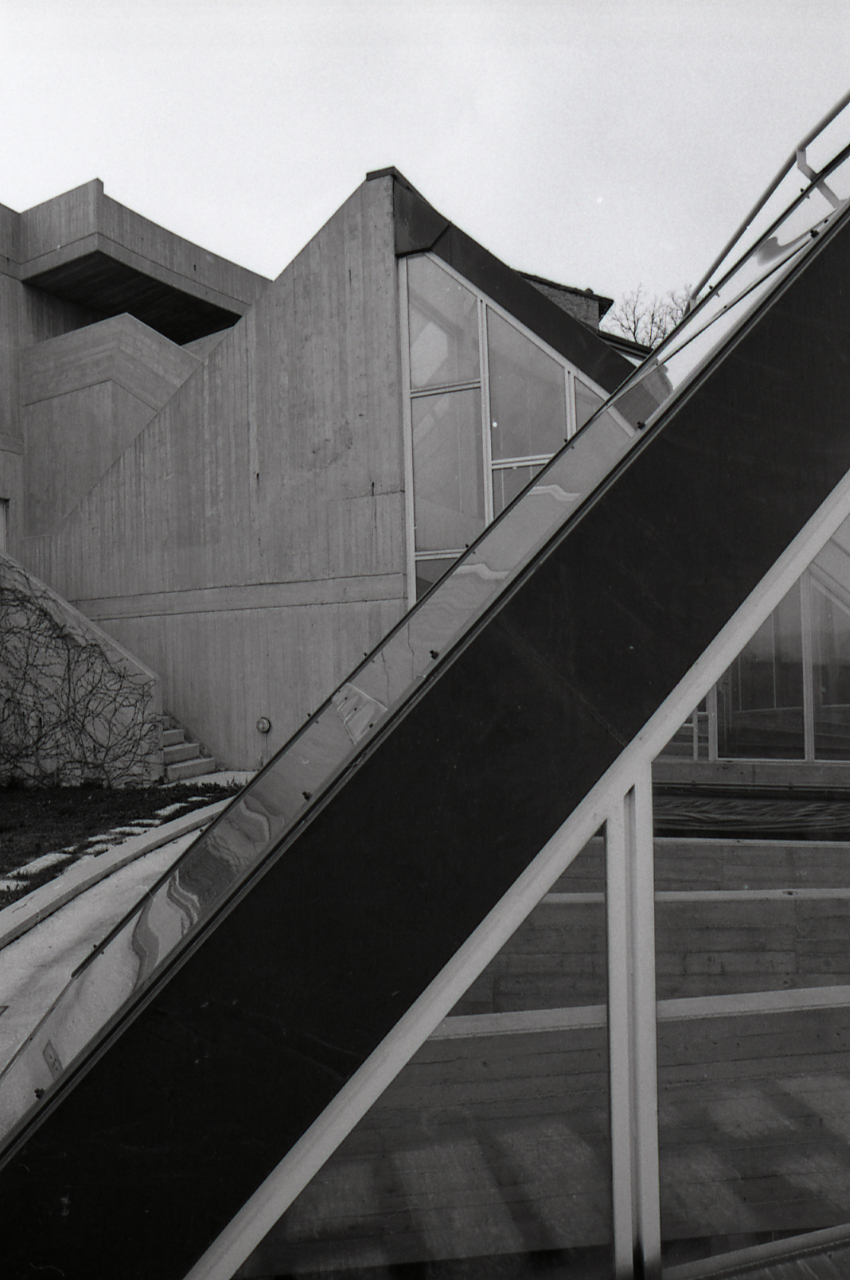
Faculty of Education, Urbino. Photo by Paolo Monti, 1982.

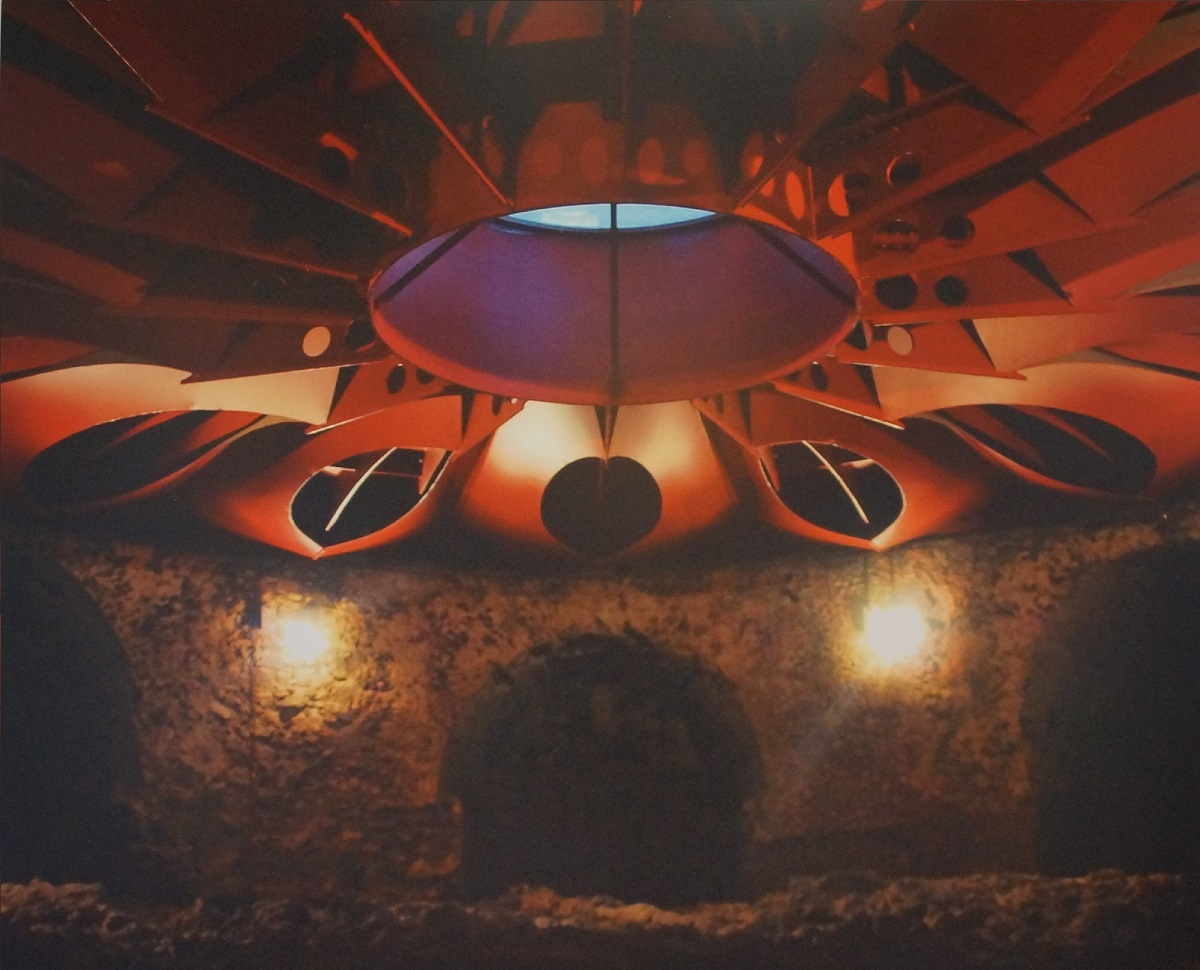
"Red Room" inside the Monastery of San Nicolò l'Arena

Between 1969 and 1974, De Carlo created the Matteotti Village, a housing complex for 3000 steel workers in Terni. Implementing his anarchist views, he included the future inhabitants in the design process. Due to conflicts with the community in the old village, the project was only partly constructed.

In 1976, De Carlo founded the ILAUD (International Laboratory of Architecture & Urban Design), based on the principles of Team 10, which took place every summer in Italy for 27 years, engaging in continuous research in the evolution of architecture. In 1978, he founded and directed the magazine Space and Society to maintain the Team 10 network and guarantee an alternative and independent voice in the European architectural sphere for the next 20 years.

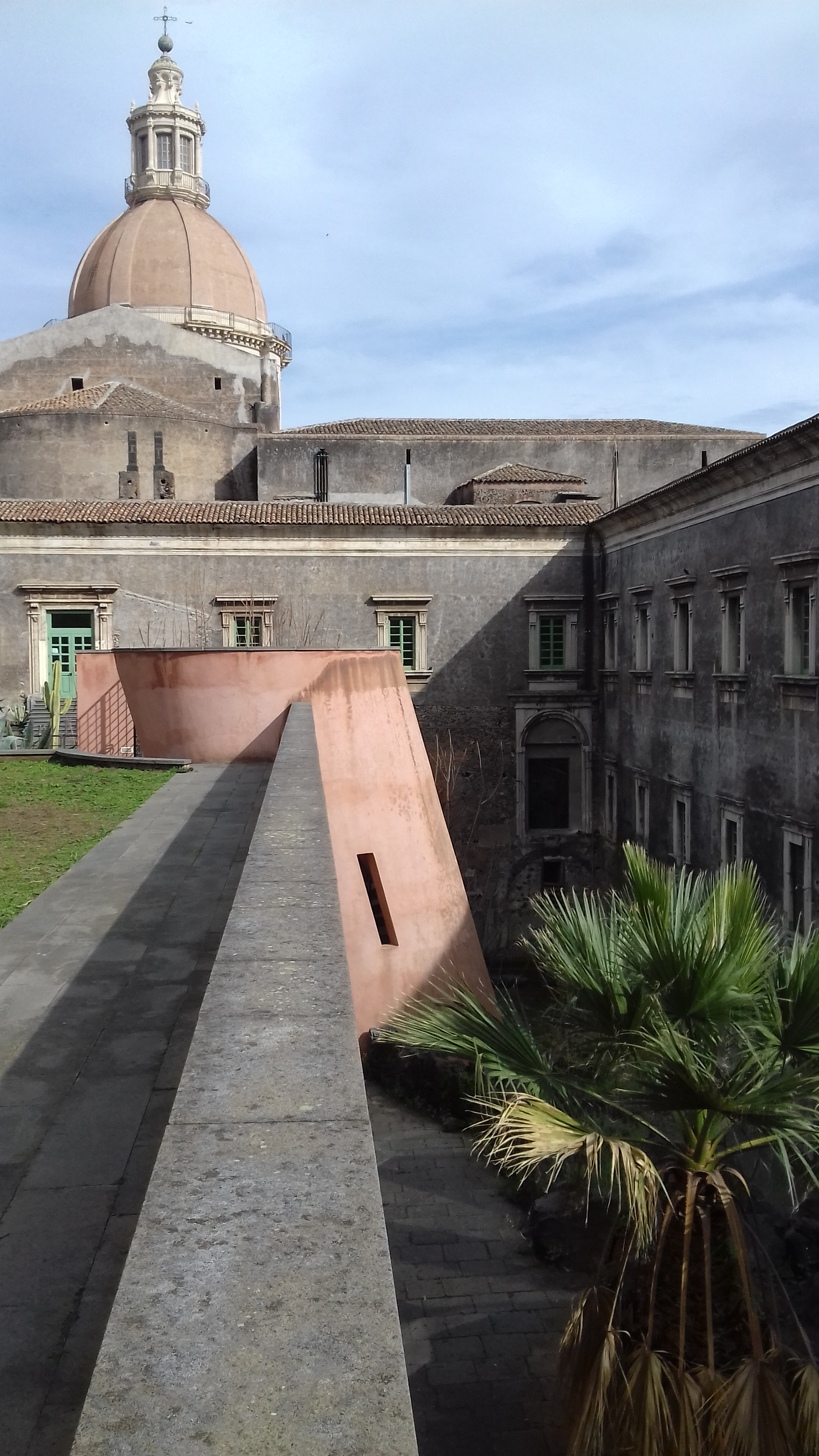
"Garden of Novices" and roof of Heating Plant, University of Catania

He died in Milan on 4 June 2005.

== Honours and awards ==
De Carlo was awarded the Wolf Prize in Arts in 1988 and the RIBA Royal Gold Medal in 1993.

Several times, he was invited to universities around the world for conferences and meetings, receiving numerous awards and recognitions. De Carlo received an Honorary Doctorate from Heriot-Watt University in 1995.

== Projects ==
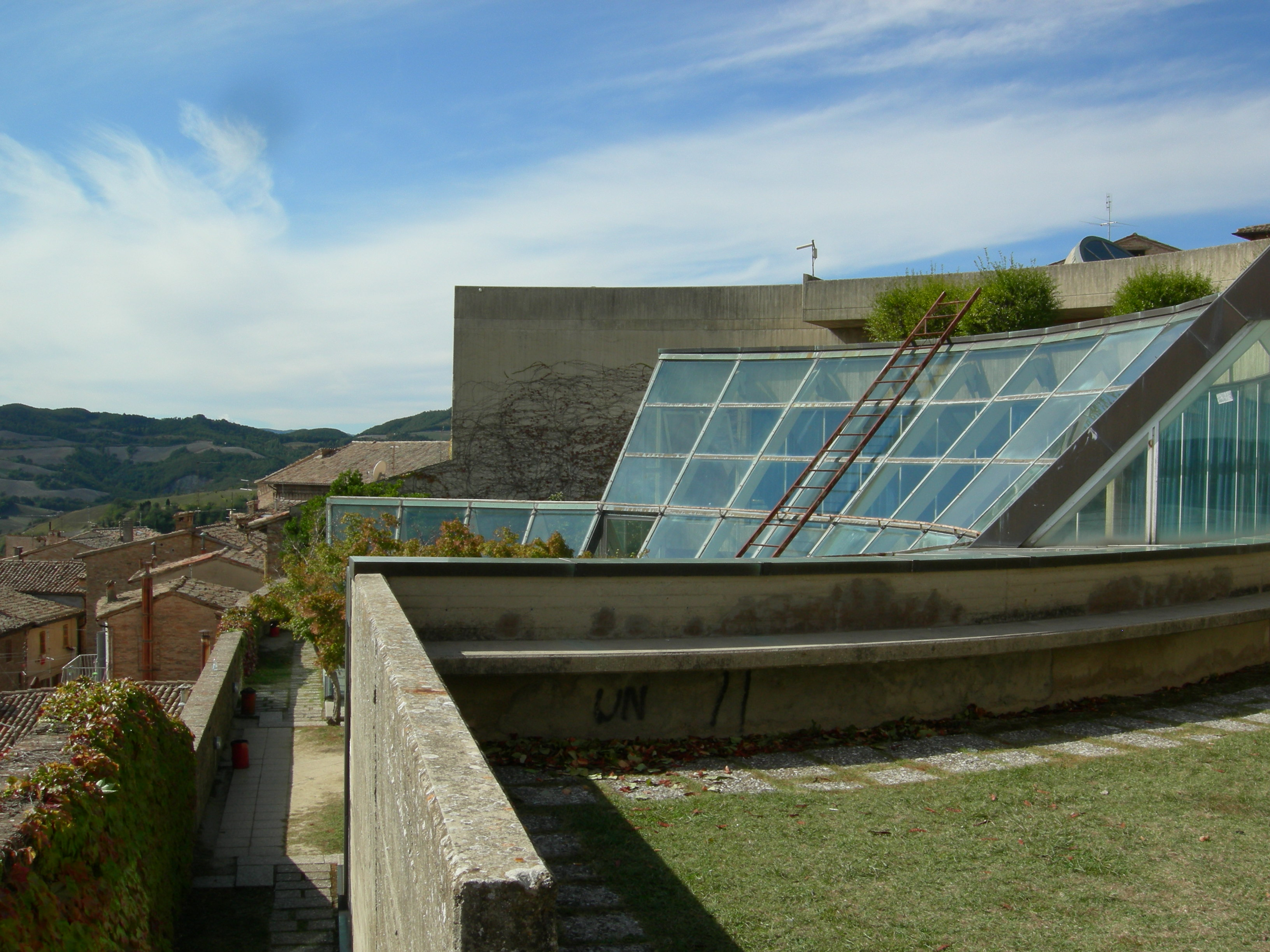
Faculty of Education (Urbino)

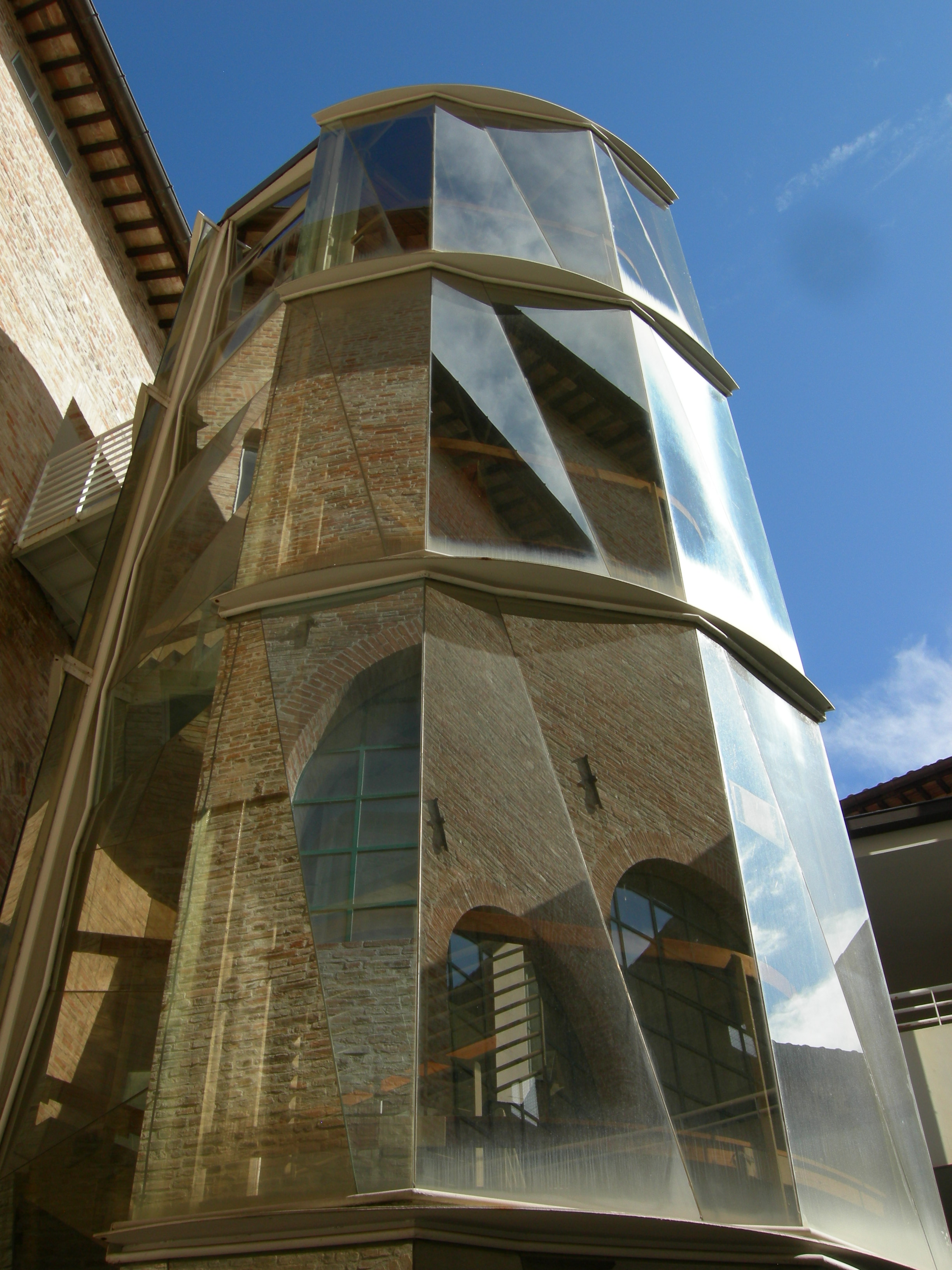
Detail of Palazzo Battiferri (Urbino)

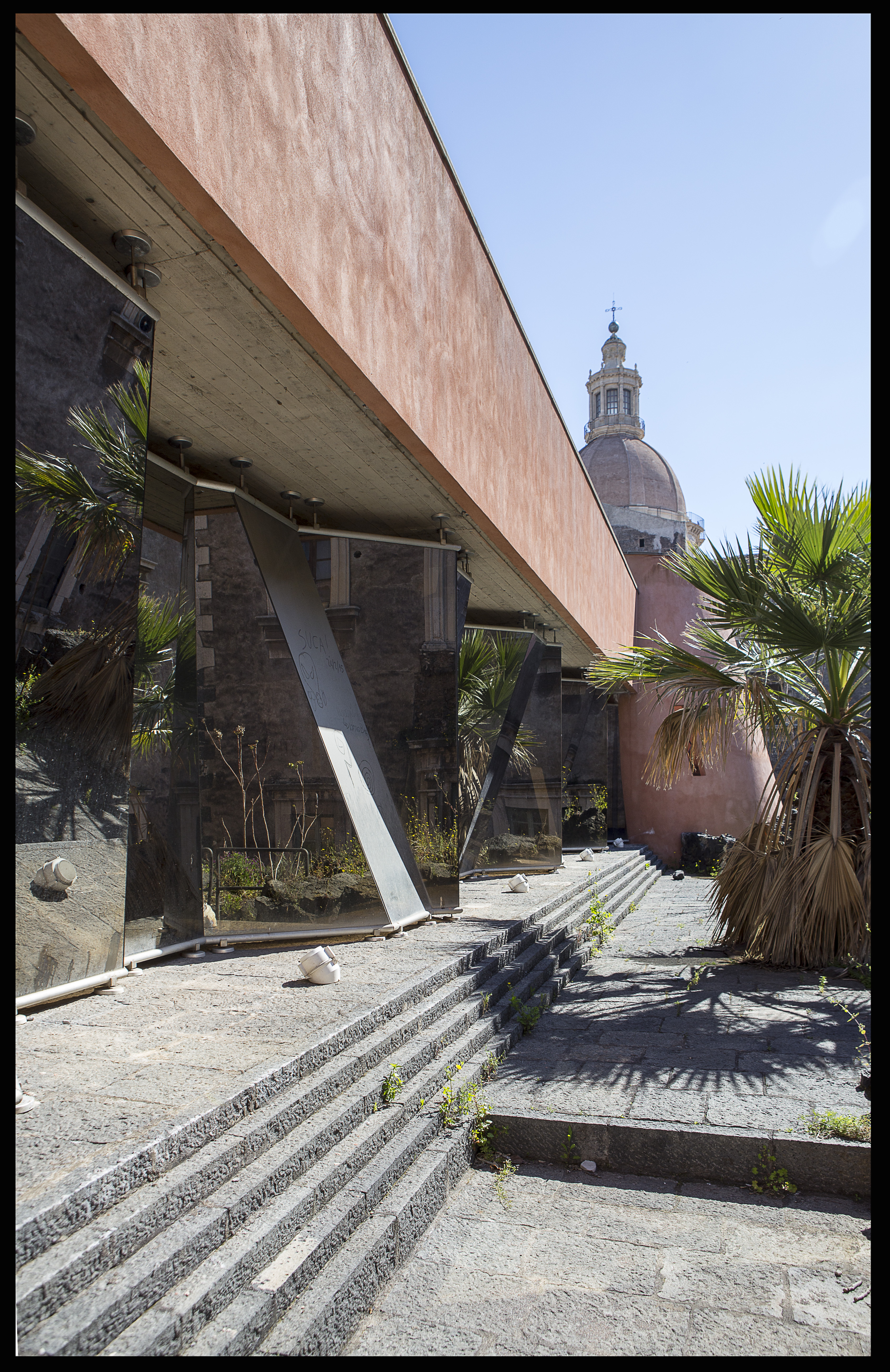
Thermal power plant, Garden of Novices

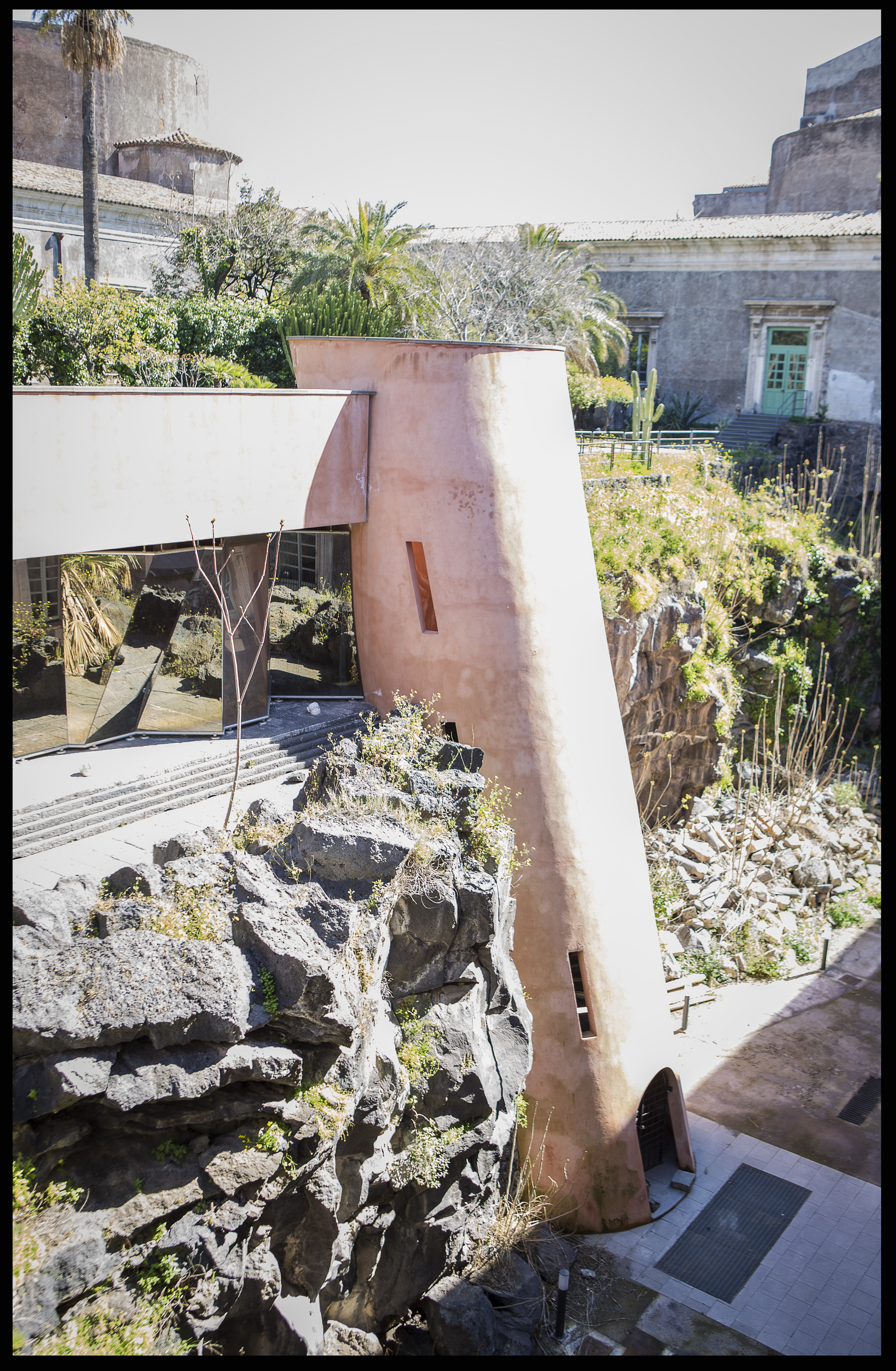
Helical staircase and thermal power plant, Garden of Novices (Monastery of San Nicolò l'Arena)

=== Commencing in the 1950s ===
- 1950–1951, Public Housing, Sesto San Giovanni, Milan.
- 1951–1953, Public Housing, Baveno.
- 1952–1960, Palazzo Bonaventura (Redevelopment), Seat of the University of Urbino.
- 1956–1957, Housing and Shops, Matera.
- 1958–1964, Masterplan, Urbino.

=== Commencing in the 1960s ===
- 1961–1965, Municipal Masterplan for Milan (with Alessandro Tutino and Silvano Tintori).
- 1961–1963, Summer Camp, Riccione.
- 1962–1965, Collegio del Colle Student Accommodation, Urbino.
- 1963, Restoration of retirement housing (Palazzo degli Anziani), Urbino.
- 1966–1968, Faculty of Law, Urbino.
- 1967–1969, La Pineta Quarter, Urbino.
- 1967–1969, Mirano Hospital, Metropolitan City of Venice
- 1968, Ca' Romanino (Casa Sichirollo), Urbino.
- 1968–1976, Faculty of Education, Urbino.
- 1969, Italian Pavilion, Osaka, Japan.
- 1969–1972, Redevelopment, Piazza del Mercatale, Urbino.

=== Commencing in the 1970s ===
- 1970–1975, Nuovo Villaggio Matteotti Housing Development, Terni.
- 1970–1972, Plan for the center of Rimini and San Giuliano.
- 1971–1975, Restoration of Francesco di Giorgio's Staircase, Urbino.
- 1973–1983, Student Accommodation, Urbino.
- 1972–1985, Faculty of Engineering, University of Pavia.
- 1977–1982, Restoration of the theatre, Teatro Sanzio, Urbino.
- 1977–1979, Elementary and Middle School, Buia/Osoppo, Udine.
- 1979, Plans for the Redevelopment of the Historic Centre of Palermo.
- 1979–1985, Housing, Mazzorbo, Venice.
- 1970s–1980s, San Miniato district urban plan, Siena.

=== Commencing in the 1980s ===
- 1980–1981, Restoration of the historic church and buildings of Cascina San Lazzaro, Pavia.
- 1980–1981, Competition entry for Piazzale delle Pace, Parma.
- 1981–1983, Restoration of the Prè area of Genoa.
- 1983, New seat for the Scuola del Libro High School, Urbino
- 1982–2001, Faculty of Medicine and Biology, University of Siena.
- 1983–1987, Restoration of the historic boatshed, Cervia
- 1986–2005, Carlo Cattaneo High School, San Miniato, province of Pisa.
- 1986–1999, Restoration of Palazzo Battiferri, Urbino.
- 1986–2004, Restoration and Redevelopment of the Monastery of San Nicolò l'Arena, Catania.
- ?–1989, Masterplan, historic centre of Lastra a Signa.
- 1989–2005, Sports Complex, Mazzorbo, Venice.
- 1989–1994, New Masterplan, Urbino.

=== Commencing in the 1990s ===
- 1992–2005, New Courthouse, Pesaro.
- 1993–1999, Restoration and redevelopment of the hamlet, Colletta di Castelbianco, Savona.
- 1994–2000, Entrance gates to the Republic of San Marino.
- 1995–2002, Café/Bathing Establishment, Nuovo Blue Moon, Lido, Venice.
- 1996, Plans for ferry dock, Thessaloniki, Greece.
- 1997–2001, Restoration of Castello di Montefiore, Recanati.
- 1997–1998, university campus, via Roccaromana, Catania.

=== Commencing in the 2000s ===
- 2000–2001, Competition entry for Ponte Parodi, Genoa.
- 2003, Competition entry for the Porta Nuova Gardens, Milan.
- 2003–2006, Housing, Wadi Abou Jmeel, Beirut, Lebanon.
- 2003–2005, Children's Centre, Ravenna.

== Bibliography ==
- Miller, Naomi (2005). "Review of Giancarlo De Carlo. Des lieux, des hommes exhibition". Journal of the Society of Architectural Historians. 64 (3): 364–367. doi:10.2307/25068170. ISSN 0037-9808. JSTOR 25068170.
