= Atelier 5 =

Swedish architectural company

Atelier 5 Architekten und Planer AG
- Industry: Architecture
- Founded: 1955
- Founder: Erwin Fritz; Samuel Gerber; Rolf Hesterberg; Hans Hostettler; Alfredo Pini
- Headquarters: Sandrainstrasse 3 Postfach CH 3001 Bern
- Website: atelier5.ch

Atelier 5 is a modernist architectural company based in Switzerland.

Atelier 5 founded in 1955 in Bern, Switzerland by the five architects Erwin Fritz, Samuel Gerber, Rolf Hesterberg, Hans Hostettler and Alfredo Pini and later joined by Niklaus Morgenthaler.

The founding members met in the studio of Hans Brechbühler, a student of Le Corbusier in the 1930s. Samuel Gerber joined from the practice of landscape designer Burle Marx in Brazil.

The company built the Halen housing development (Structuralism) between 1955 and 1962 in the Canton of Bern, Switzerland.

They built the St Bernards estate at Park Hill, Croydon, south London for Wates in 1969–70.
