= Architecture of Casablanca =

Built environment in Morocco

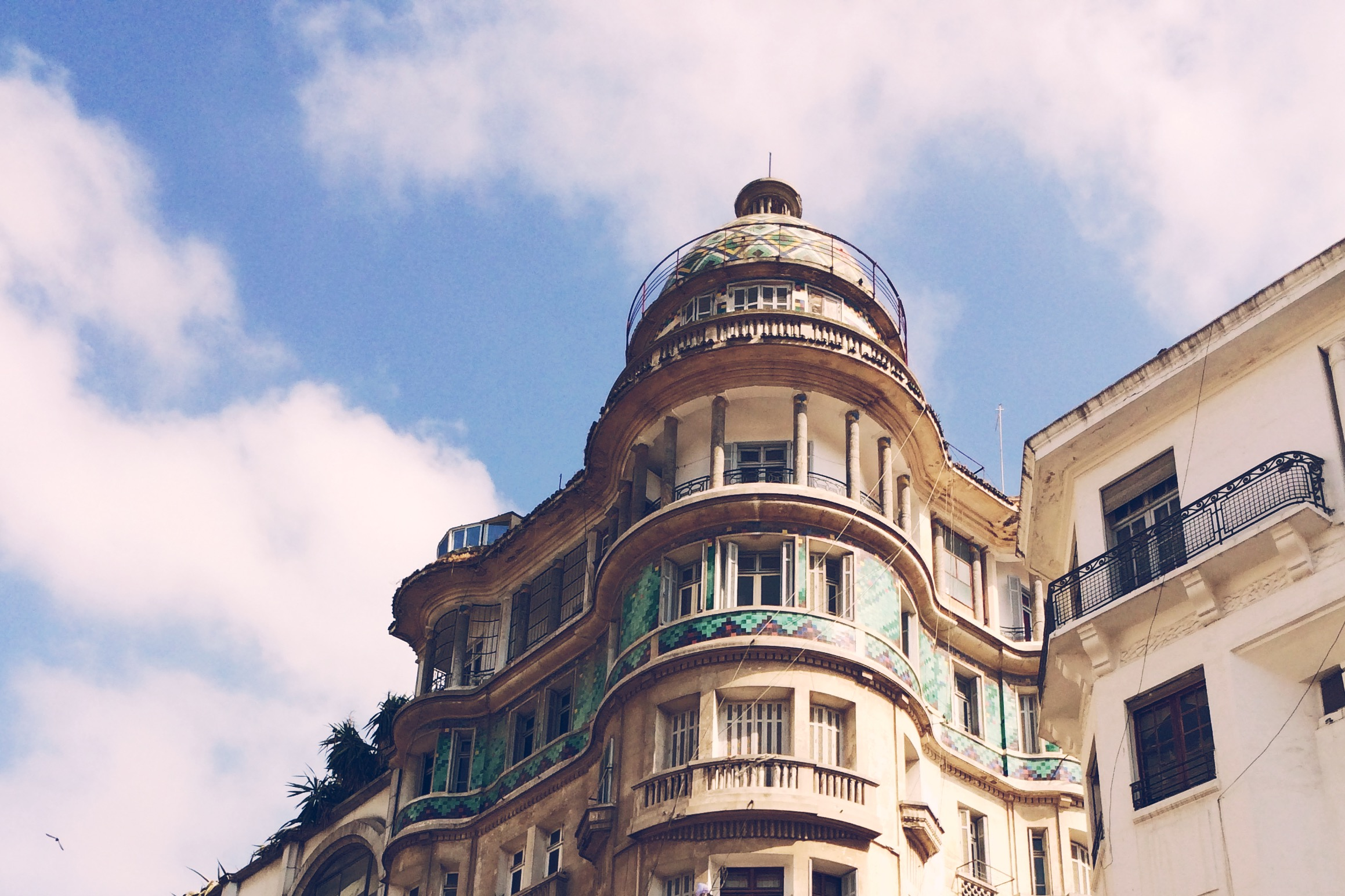
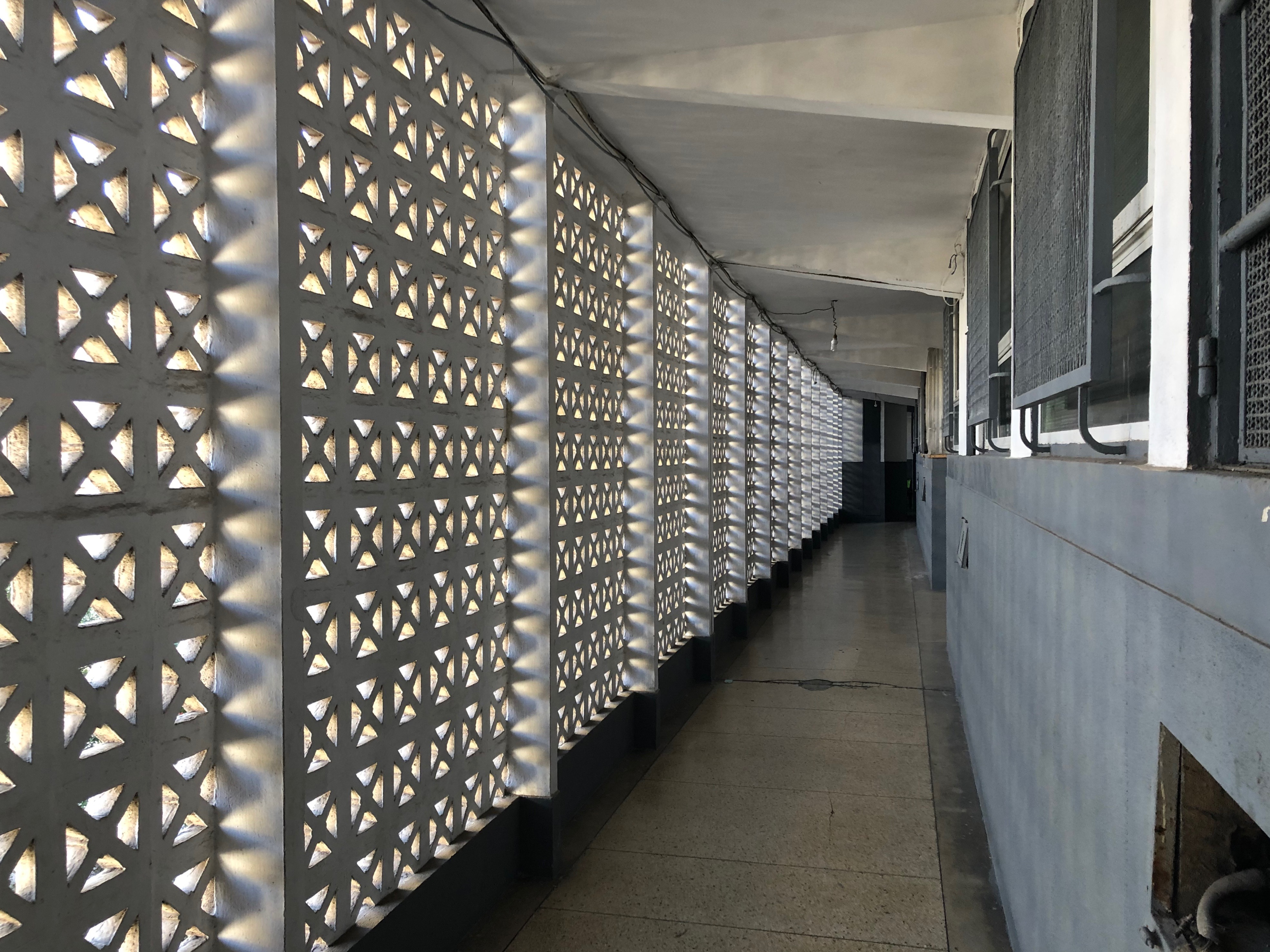
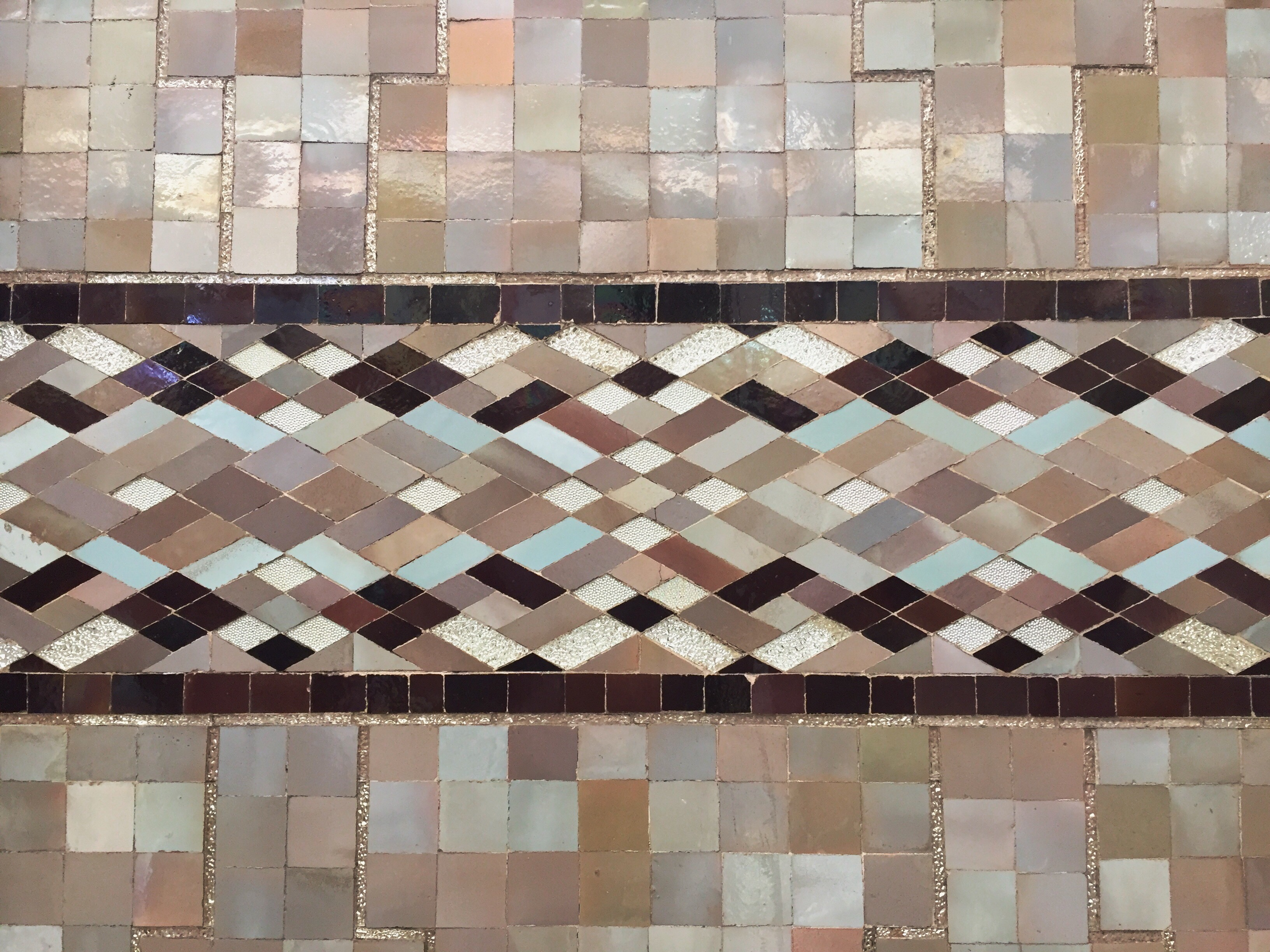
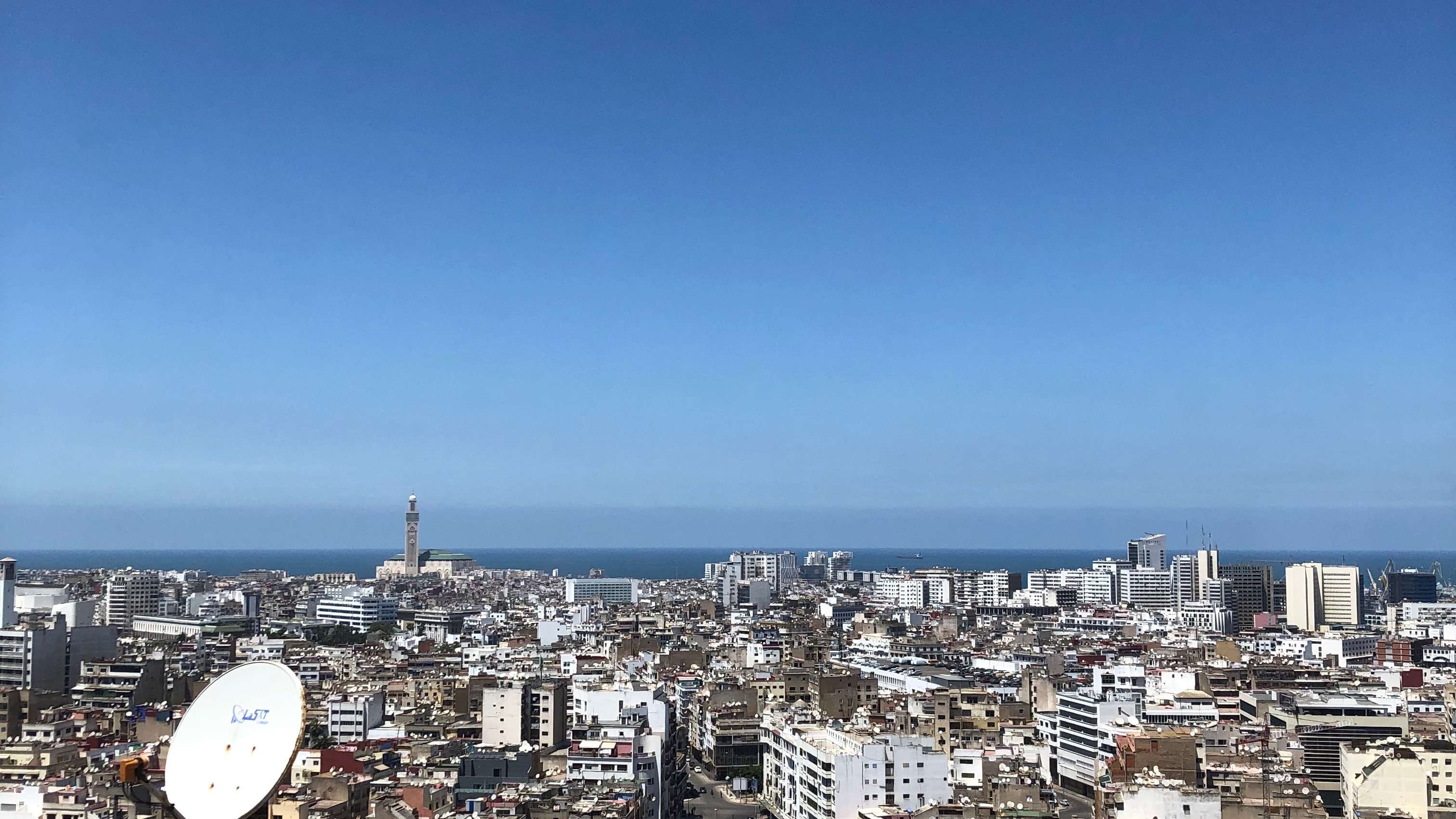
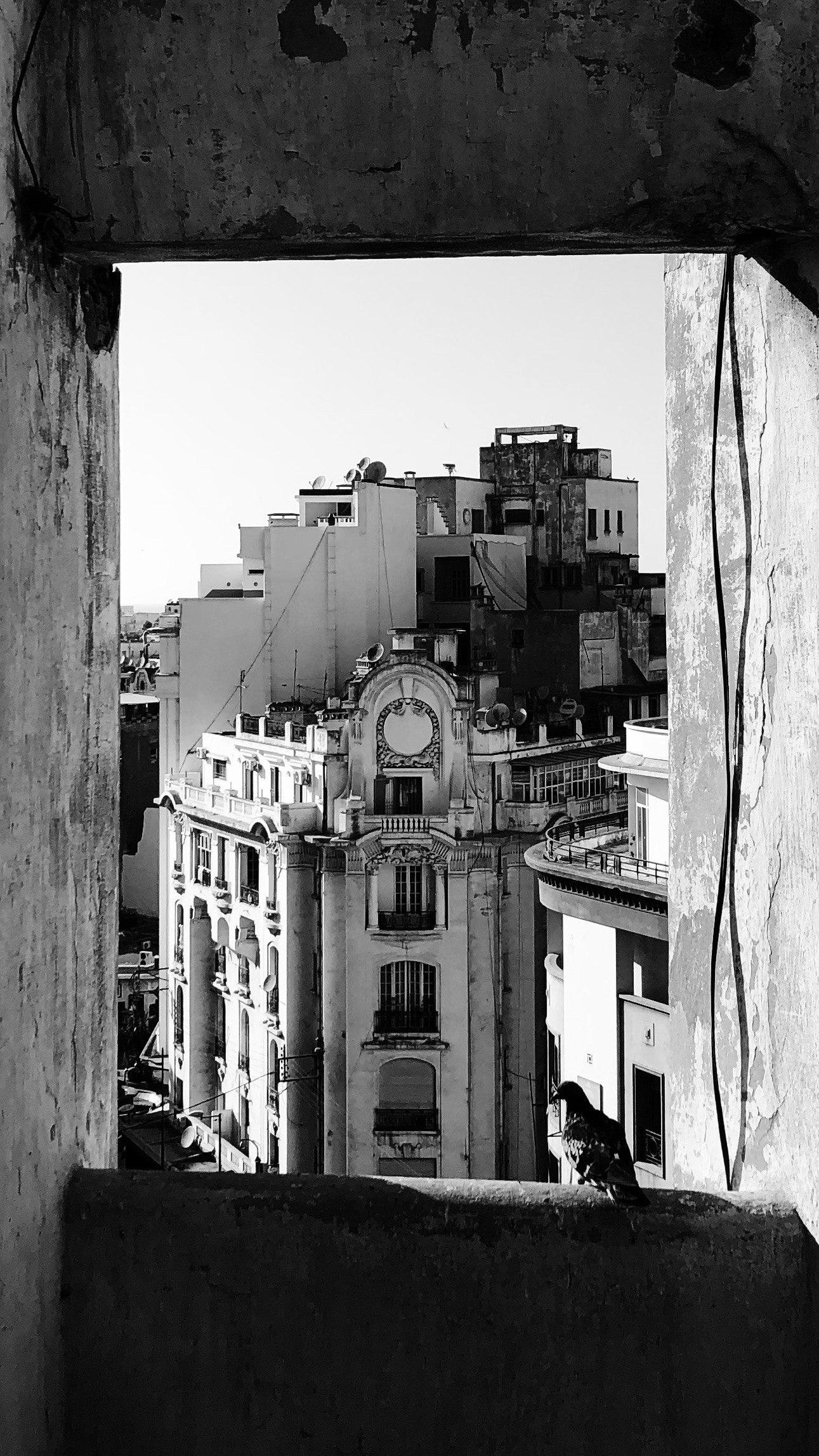
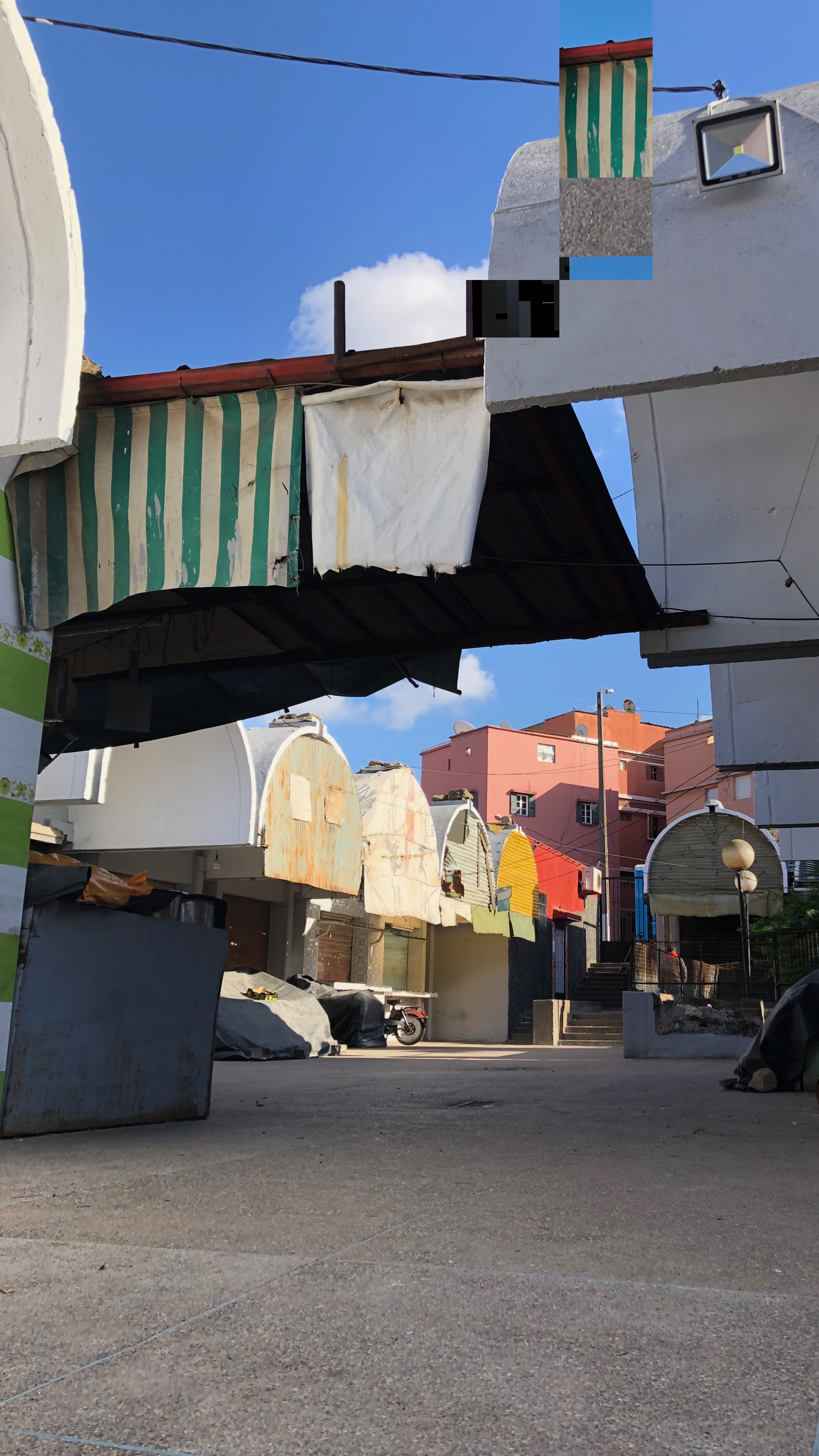
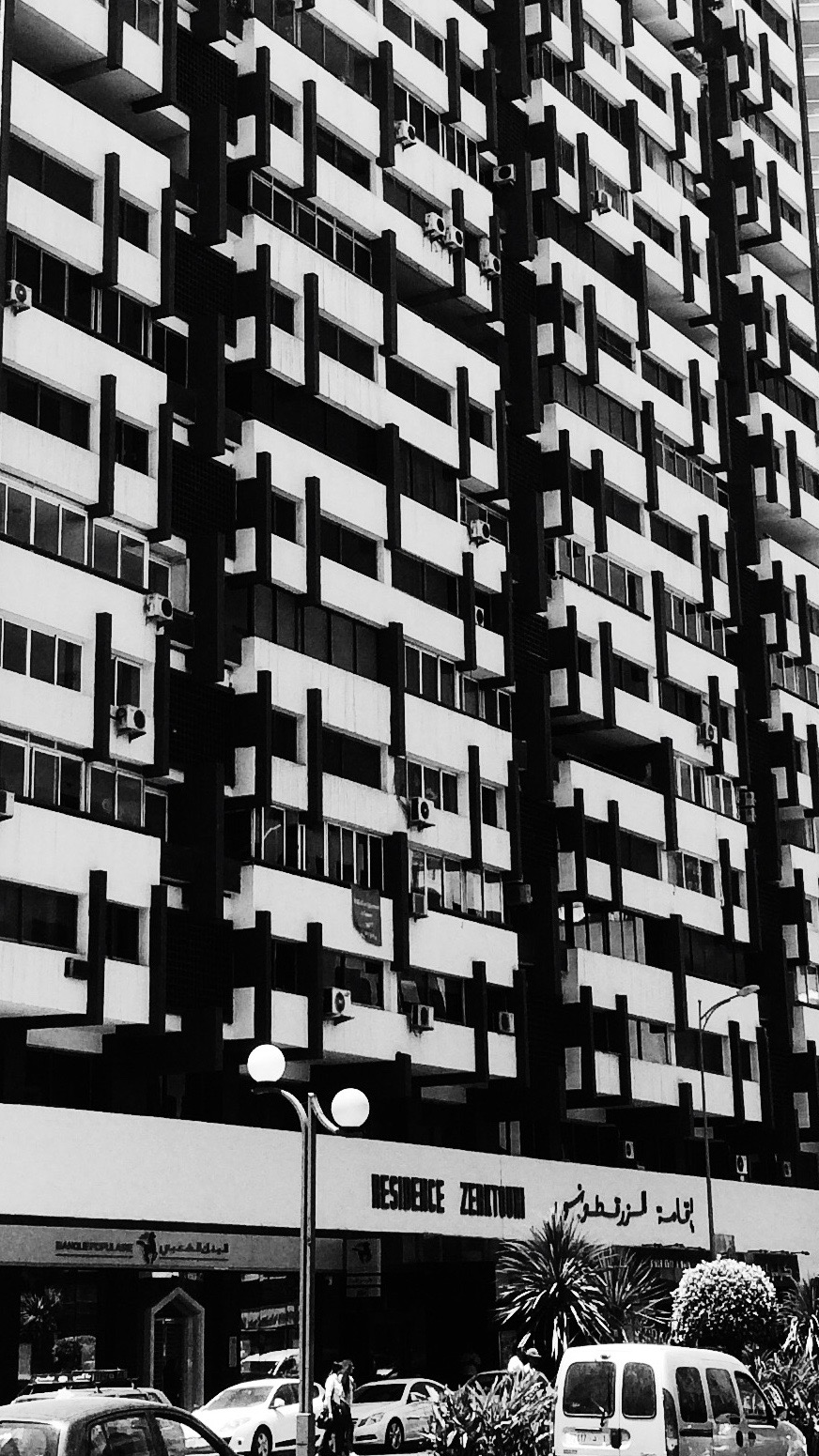
From top, left to right: Maret Building, Marshal Ameziane Housing Development, zellij at Bank al-Maghreb, view over Casablanca from the Liberty Building, a colonial building seen from atop the Lévy-Bendayan Building, Bournazel Market, Zerktouni Residence.

The architecture of Casablanca is diverse and historically significant. Casablanca, Morocco's economic capital, has a rich urban history and is home to many notable buildings in a variety of styles. Throughout the 20th century, architecture and urban development in Casablanca evolved in a way that was simultaneously specific to the city's contexts, and consonant with international ideas.

Anfa, as the settlement in what is now Casablanca was known, was built by the Romans according to the Descrittione dell’Africa of Leo Africanus. The city is located at the mouth of Wādi Būskūra on the Atlantic Ocean in the Chaouia plain, known as Tamasna under the Barghawata. It was destroyed by the earthquake of 1755 and rebuilt by Sultan Muhammad III of Morocco, who employed European architects, and it was renamed Ad-dār al-Bayḍā (الدار البيضاء). The sqala, the medina walls, and the two oldest mosques date back to this period.

The 1906 Algeciras Conference gave the French holding company la Compagnie Marocaine permission to build a modern port in Casablanca. The French bombardment of Casablanca the following year destroyed much of the city, which at the time consisted of the medina, the mellah (Jewish quarter), and an area known as Tnaker. One of the first French constructions was a clock tower in the likeness of a minaret, an early example of a style called Neo-Mauresque, which would characterize much of Casablanca's architecture in the early colonial period, particularly civic and administrative buildings.

Under the French Protectorate officially established in 1912, the resident general Hubert Lyautey employed Henri Prost in the urban planning of Casablanca. Prost's radio-centric plan divided the city into the ville indigène, where the Moroccans would live, and a ville nouvelle for the Europeans fanning out to the east. Many buildings in Art Nouveau and Art Deco were designed by architects such as Marius Boyer in the ville nouvelle through the 1930s, while the French colonial apparatus experimented with the urban planning of neighborhoods such as the Hubous and the Bousbir.

The Paquebot style or Streamline Moderne, which architects such as Edmond Brion embraced in the 1930s, indicated a transition toward Modern architecture. In the 1940s, Michel Écochard took over urban planning and focused on a linear plan with industrial development to the east and housing projects to address overpopulation, such as those at Carrières Centrales. He led the Groupe des Architectes Modernes Marocains (GAMMA), which revolutionized modernist architecture at the 1953 International Congress of Modern Architecture by emphasizing the importance of considering local culture and climate in addition to modernist architectural principles. This approach is called vernacular modernism.

Elie Azagury became the first Moroccan modernist architect and led the GAMMA after Morocco's independence from France in 1956. He and his colleague Jean-François Zevaco were among the most important architects in Casablanca in the later 20th century. They, along with Abdeslam Faraoui and Patrice de Mazières, experimented with Brutalist architecture. The architecture of Casablanca at the turn of the 20th century was influenced by the politics of Neoliberalism.

== Traditional Moroccan ==
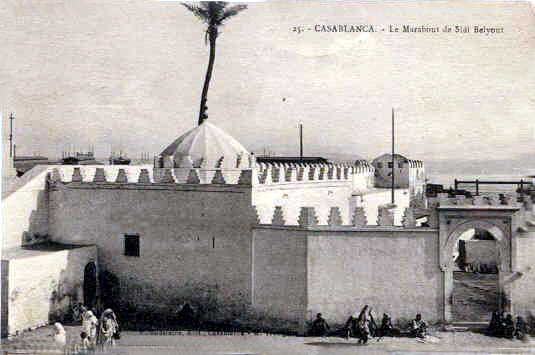
The qubba of the ḍarīh of Sidi Belyout.

Casablanca retains many authentic examples of traditional Moroccan architecture, particularly within the city walls of the historic Medina of Ad-Dār Al-Bayḍāʾ. There are a number of aḍriħa (mausolea) including those of Sidi Allal al-Qairawani and Sidi Belyout. Casablanca was one of a number of cities—including Essaouira, Marrakesh, and Rabat—that were revitalized after the earthquake of 1755, by Sultan Mohammed ben Abdallah—who Abdallah Laroui called "the architect of modern Morocco." The sultan was known to have used European architects, such as Théodore Cornut and Ahmed el Inglizi, in his projects. The Sqala bastion and the two oldest mosques in the city, the Mosque of the Makhzen and the Ould el-Hamra Mosque, were built during Sultan Muhammad Ben Abdallah's renovations to the city.

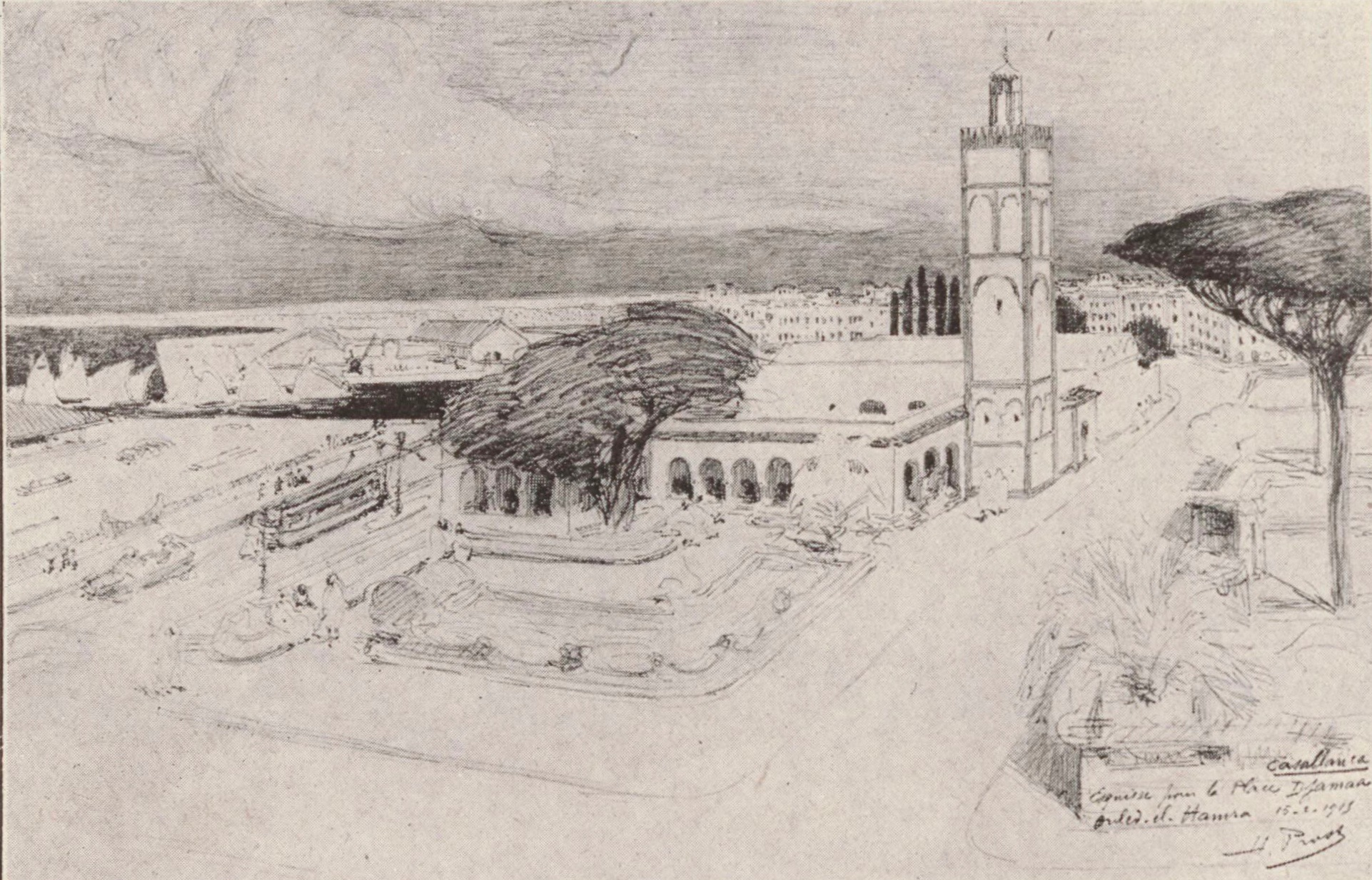
A 1915 sketch by Henri Prost for the area around the Ould el-Hamra Mosque.

The city's population grew under the protégé system as Europeans settled in the city, and with the migration of Jews from the interior of the country. In 1886, Élisée Reclus described Casablanca as a "European coastal settlement" and "desolate and extremely unhealthy."

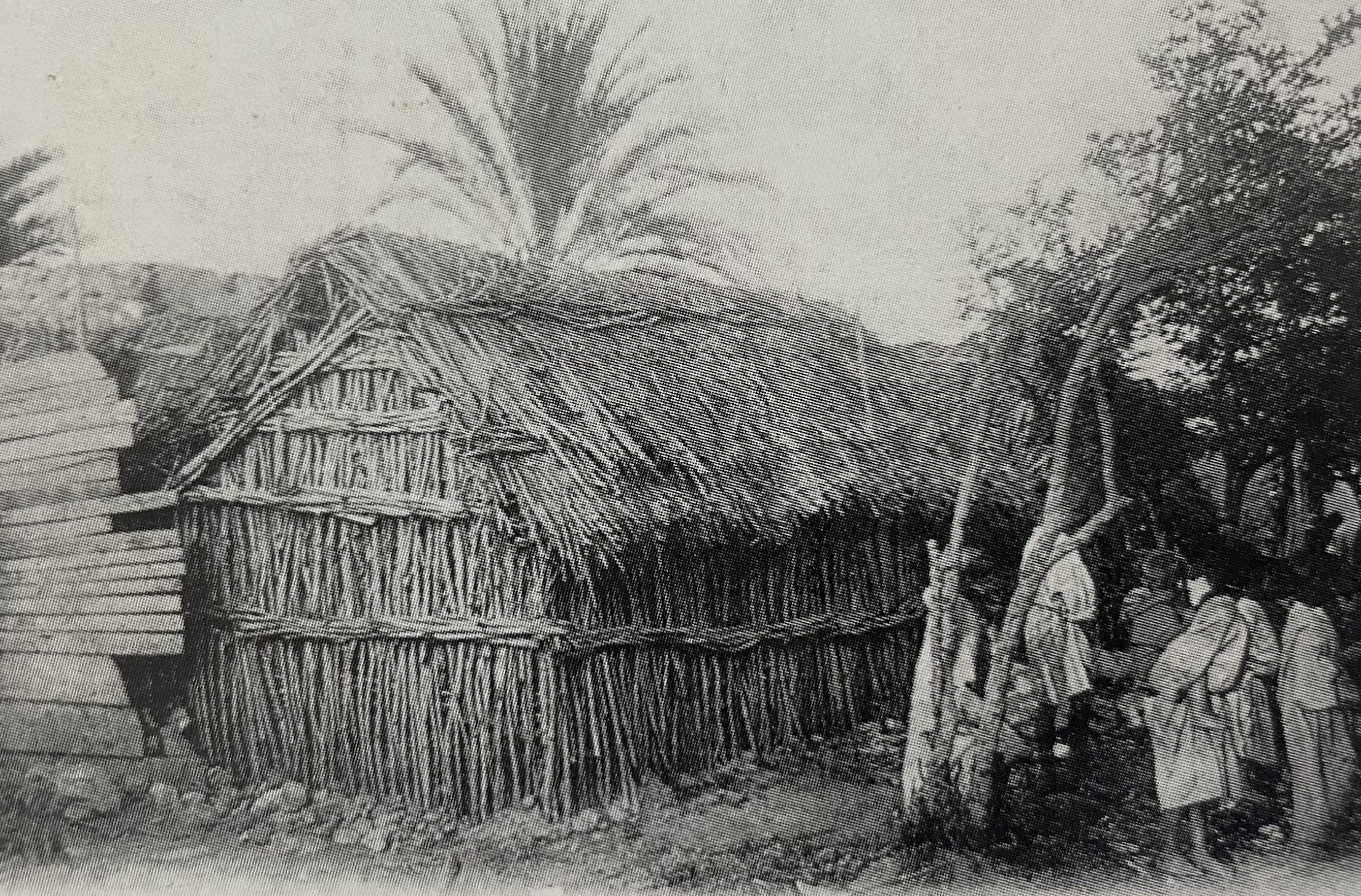
A nawāl or tankīra, origin of the name of the Tnaker neighborhood, circa 1910.

In his 1900 map of the city, Dr. Frédéric Weisgerber identified three main parts: the medina, the mellah, and the Tnaker (huts). Casablanca hosted a kissaria, fonduqs, and a fresh produce market along the Wadi Bouskoura stream, at what is now the United Nations Square.

The medina was largely destroyed in the French bombardment of 1907, though several important buildings remain.

== Colonial architecture ==
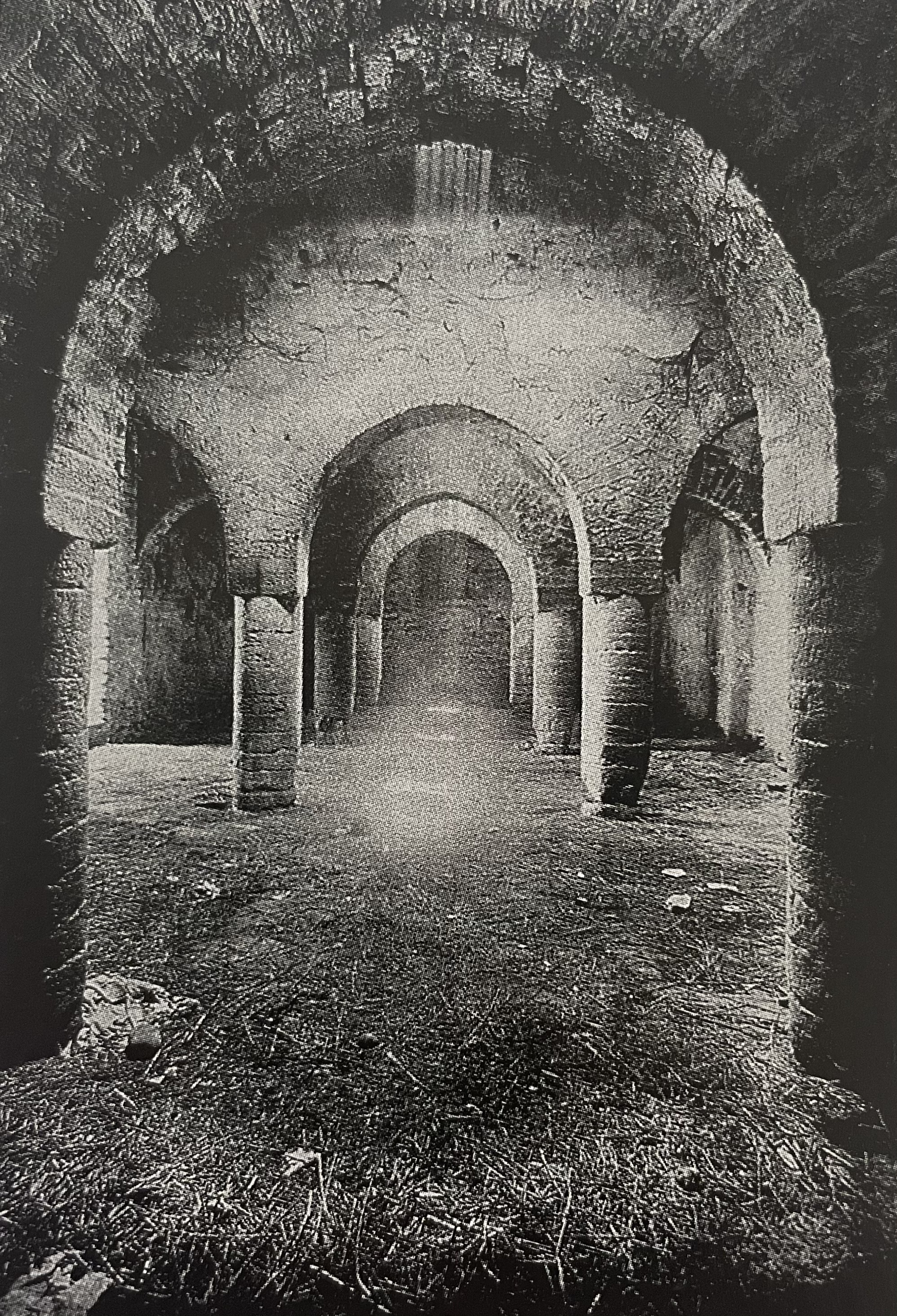
Remains of the Portuguese prison, the oldest European structure in Casablanca, circa 1900.

The oldest European structure in Casablanca was an abandoned prison allegedly built by the Portuguese, arcades of which now decorate the Arab League Park.

The Church of San Buenaventura (now the Buenaventura Cultural Center) was built in the medina by the Spanish community of Casablanca in 1890.

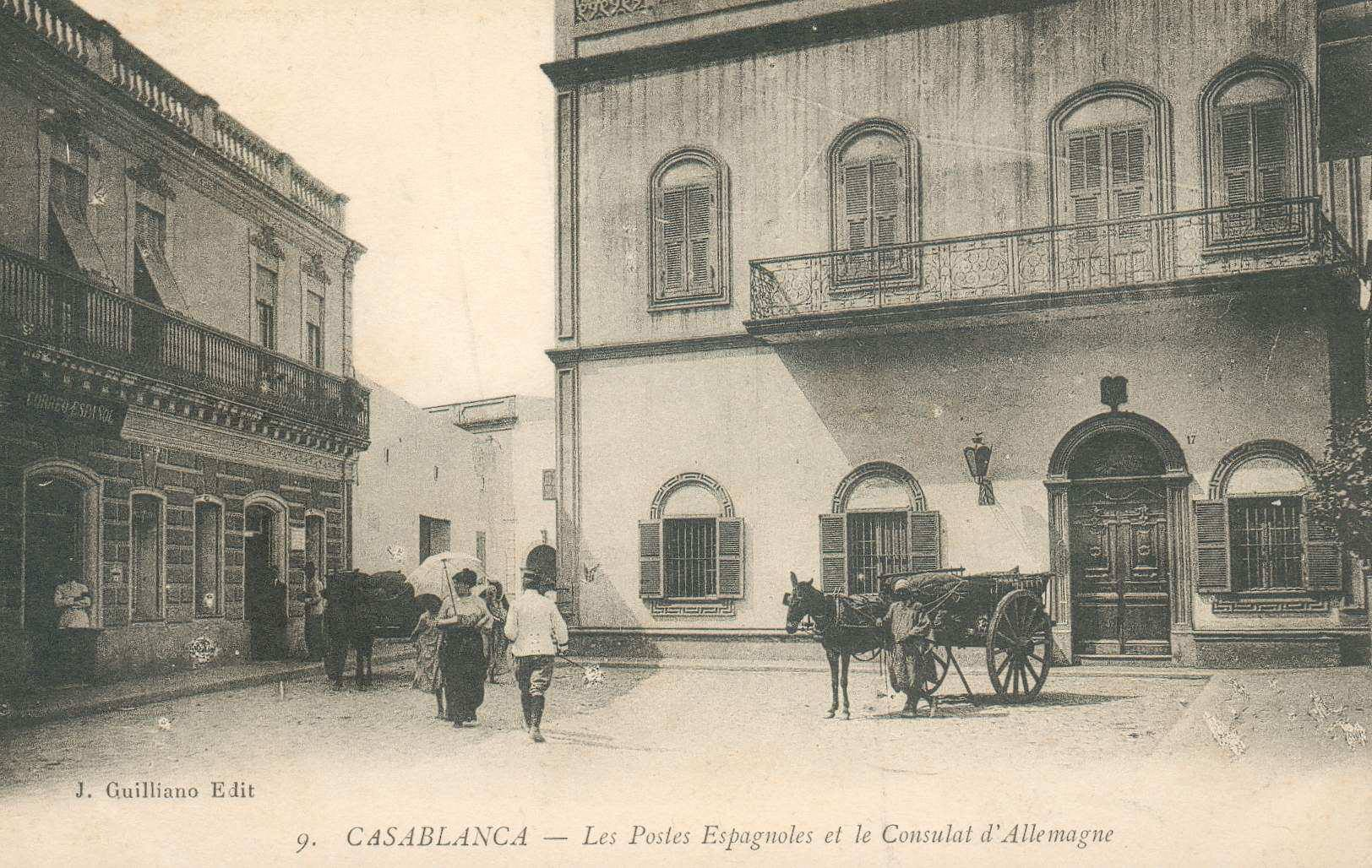
The German consulate (1900) in the medina, Omar Ibn Abdelaziz Primary School since 1919.

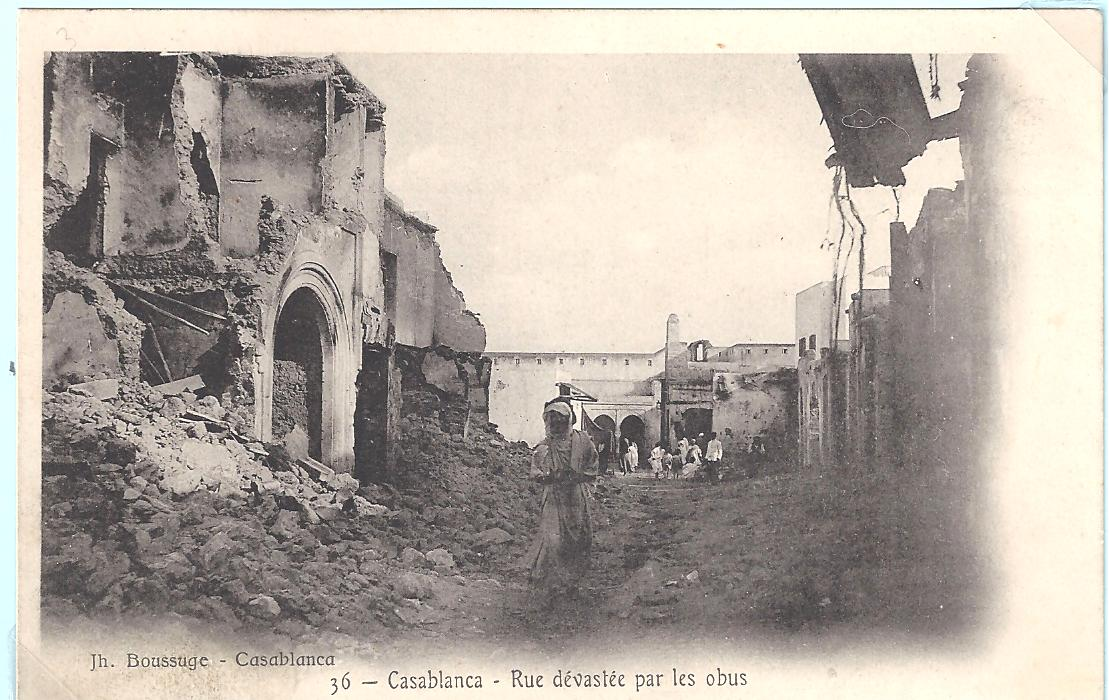
Casablanca in the aftermath of the bombardment of 1907.

In 1900, Casablanca had four consulates and thirteen vice-consulates, which replaced others in Mazagan (al-Jadida), Rabat, and Mogador (Essaouira). Many of these consulates were built along the waterfront to be easily accessible. The first of these was the British consulate, established in 1857. The German consulate, originally built as the Belgian consulate in 1900, became the Omar Ibn Abdelaziz Primary School in 1919.

The original clock tower erected by Charles Martial Joseph Dessigny in 1910 was the first structure built by the French after the bombardment and invasion of Casablanca in 1907.

=== French Protectorate ===
Throughout the decades of the French Protectorate (1912–1956), the urban development of Casablanca was "first and foremost driven by [French] economic interests." The city was designed with automotive traffic and eventual industrial complexes—such as the port and railroad lines—in mind.

==== Ville nouvelle ====
Villes nouvelles ('new towns'), residential areas built primarily for expatriate populations alongside villes indigènes ('indigenous towns') throughout the French colonial empire, were designed to be picturesque and to apply principles of modern urban planning. Lyautey's urban strategy in Morocco, shaped by a pragmatist regard toward colonized populations gained through his military experience in Indochina and Madagascar, was to construct villes nouvelles and to leave villes indigènes virtually untouched, even to subject them to a kind of Orientalist preservation.

Jean-Claude Nicolas Forestier, landscape gardener and head of the Service des Promenades et des Plantations in Paris for 26 years, was summoned from France at the recommendation of Paul Tirard, general secretary of the colonial government in Morocco. Forestier became the first professional to work on the villes nouvelles in Morocco, and he convinced Henri Prost to design plans for villes nouvelles in Morocco with Georges Risler, president of the Musée social. Forestier and Prost, both active members in the Musée social's section of urban and rural hygiene, introduced the idea of a cité-jardin, inspired by garden city movement in England.

Casablanca is boldly constructing new projects that Paris is too timid to try.

— Léandre Vaillat,

==== Prost's plan ====
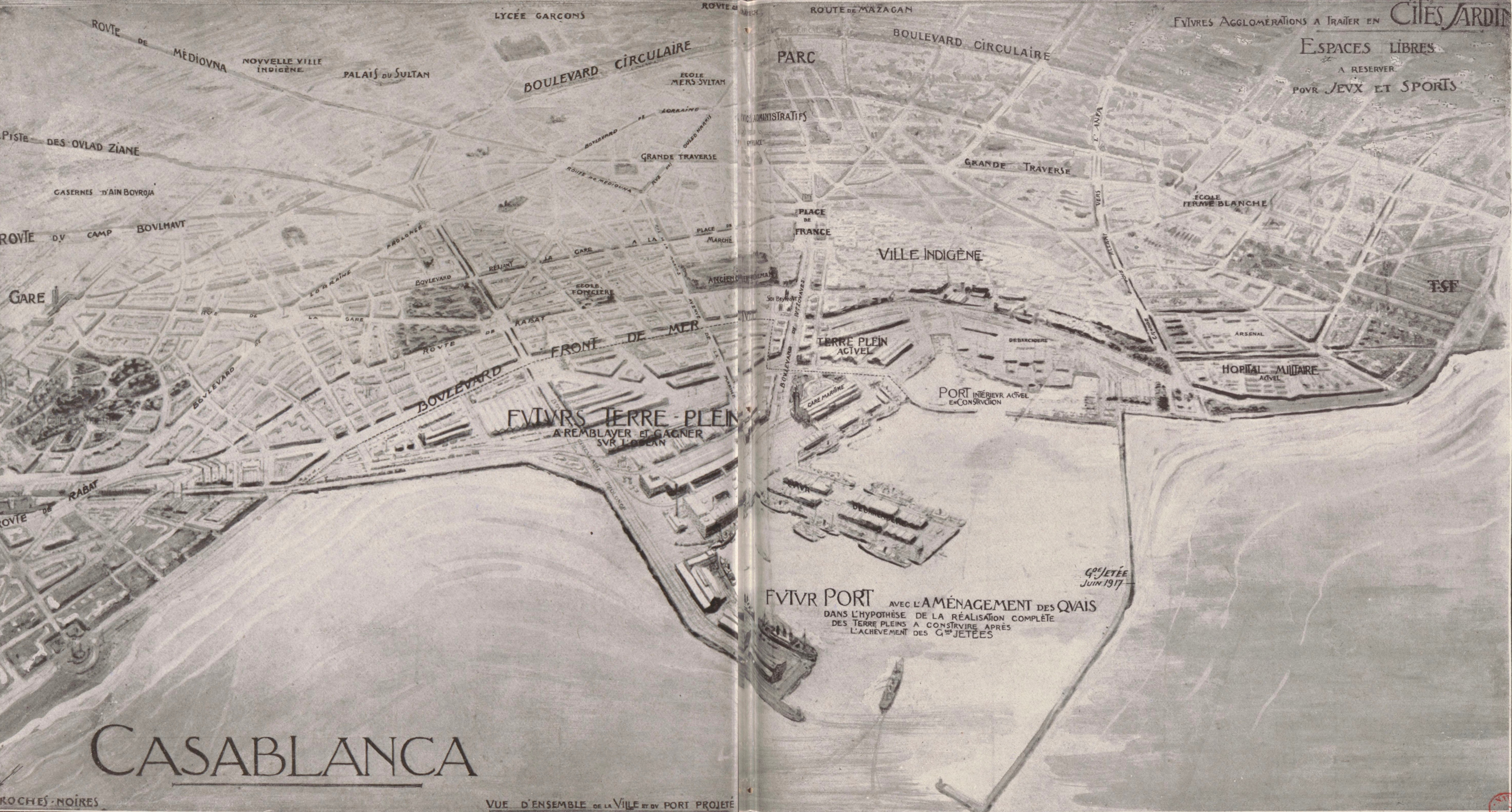
Henri Prost's 1914 radio-concentric plan for Casablanca.

Casablanca became a laboratory for the principles of urbanisme d’avant-garde, including a trenchant division and complete disassociation between the medina and the ville européenne. For the colonial administration, the Moroccan medina was at once a breeding ground of disease to be contained, an antiquity of the past with Oriental charm to be preserved, and a refuge for would-be insurgents to be squelched.

Henri Prost, General Lyautey's handpicked urban planner, designed the ville européenne or ville nouvelle of Casablanca as a new town.

The plan was radio-concentric, like Paris. The main streets radiated southeast from the port, the medina, and the Souq Kbir (السوق الكبير grand market) which became Place de France and is now United Nations Square. This square linked the medina, the mellah, and the ville européenne.

Hippolyte Joseph Delaporte designed the first two major buildings to mark the square: the Paris-Maroc stores (1914) and the neo-mauresque Hotel Excelsior (1918). The former represented the colonial power's conquest of Morocco and commerce in Morocco, and Claude Farrère said of the latter that "meetings of stock exchange, finance, and commerce took place exclusively in the four cafés surrounding it." The Central Market (1917) by Pierre Bousquet was built at the site of the Casablanca Fair of 1915. In 1917, Casablanca became the second city in the world, after New York's 1916 Zoning Resolution, to adopt a comprehensive urban plan.

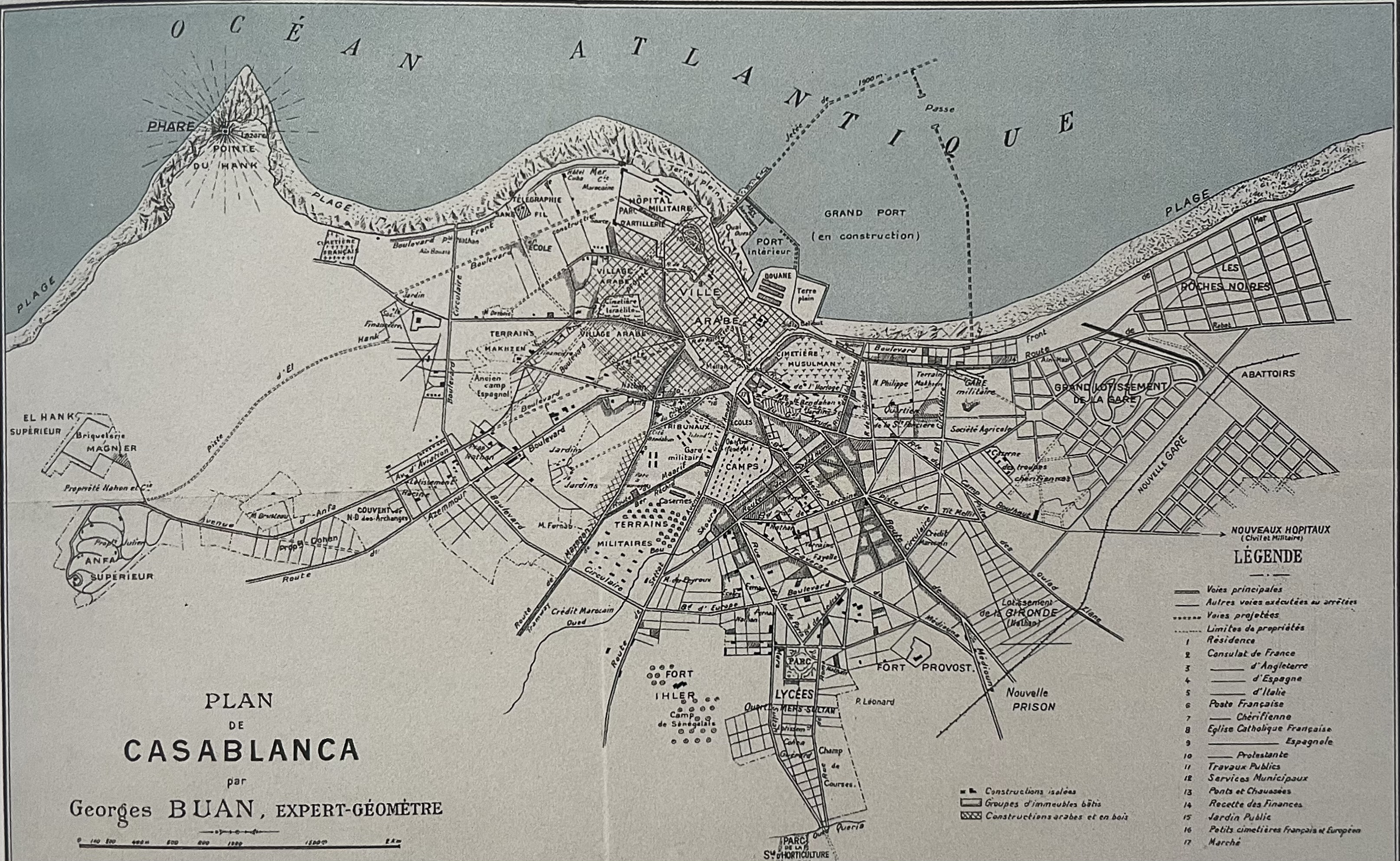
Georges Buan's plan appearing in the guide for the Casablanca Fair of 1915

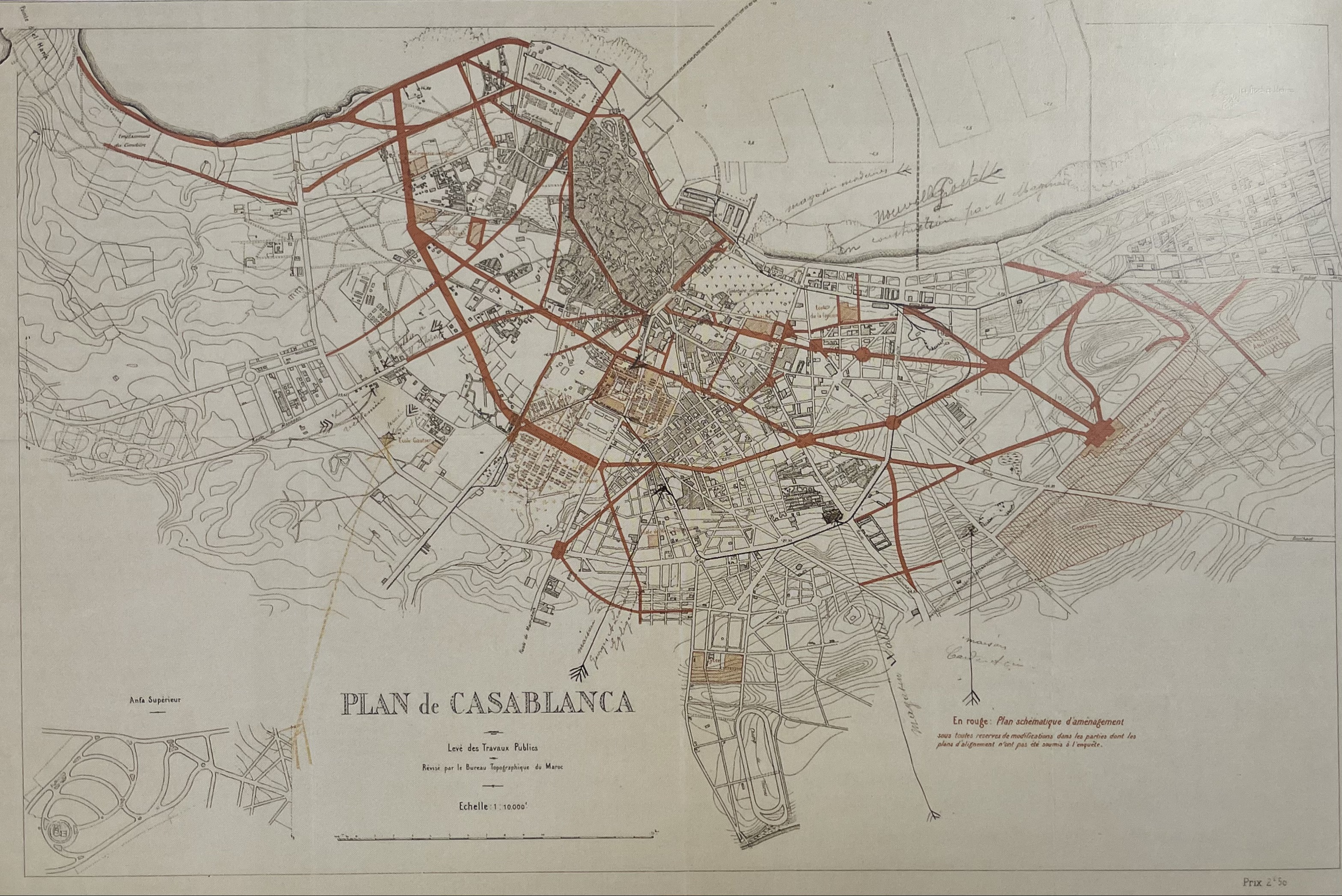
Prost's road plan for his 1917 extension and development plan

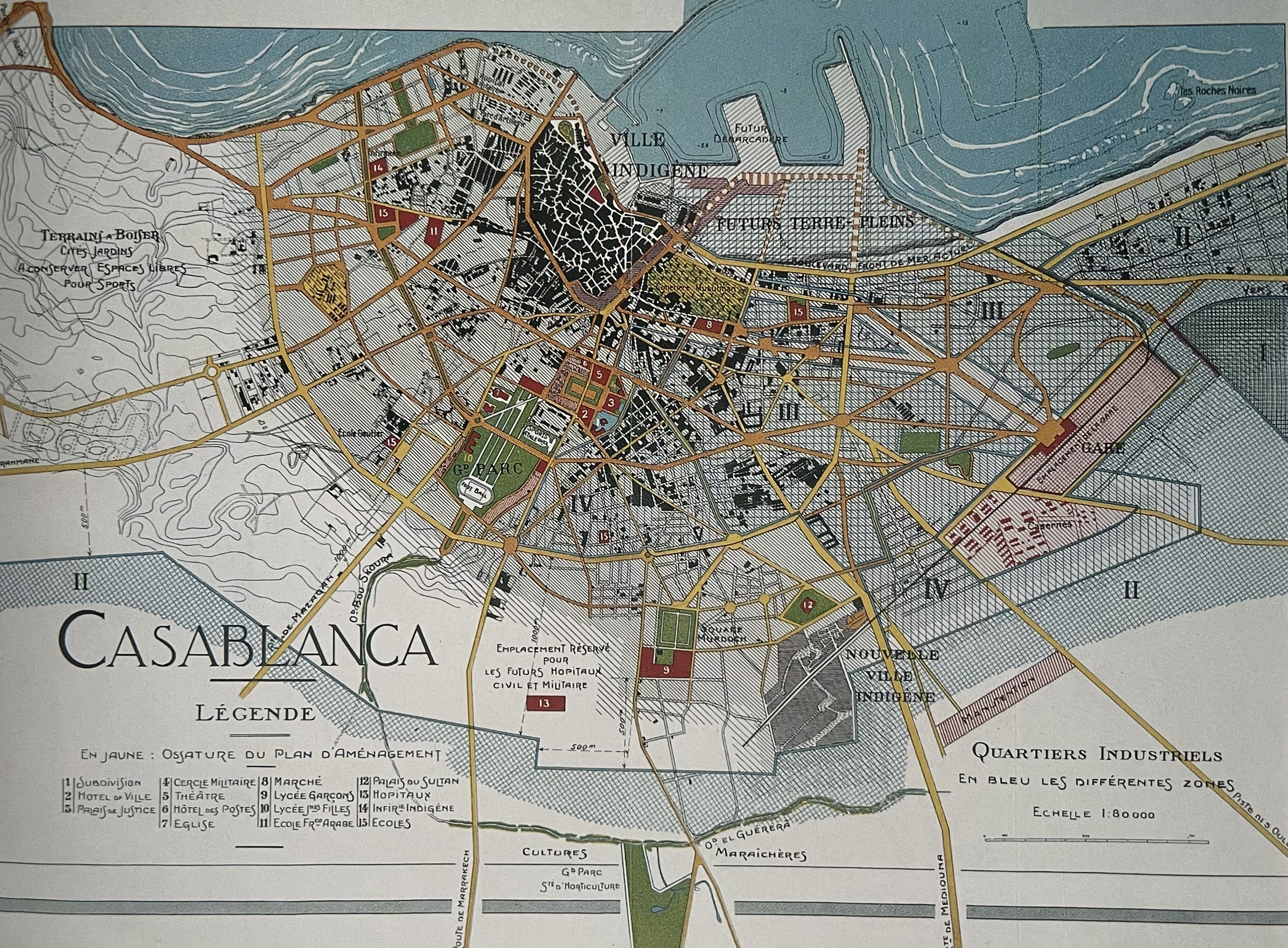
A map of the development and extension plan published in France-Maroc.

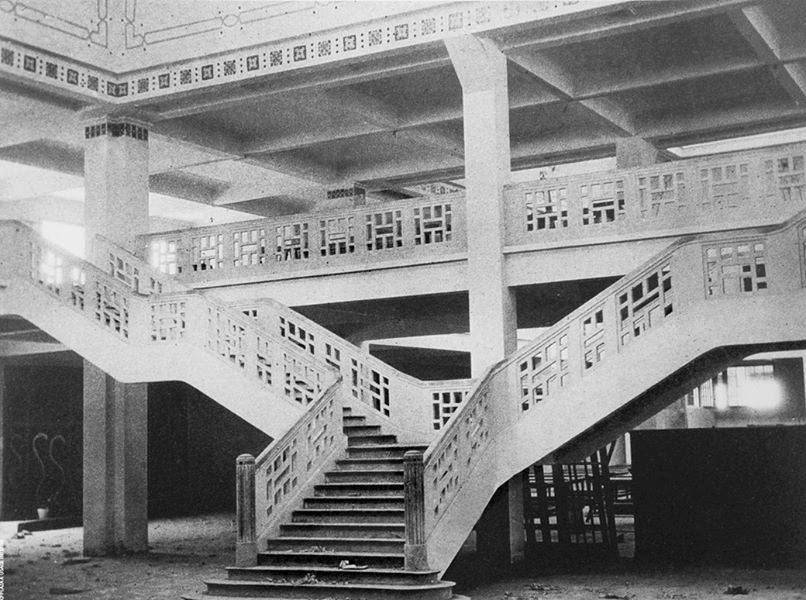
The interior of the Magasins Paris-Maroc building, by Hippolyte Delaporte and Auguste Perret.

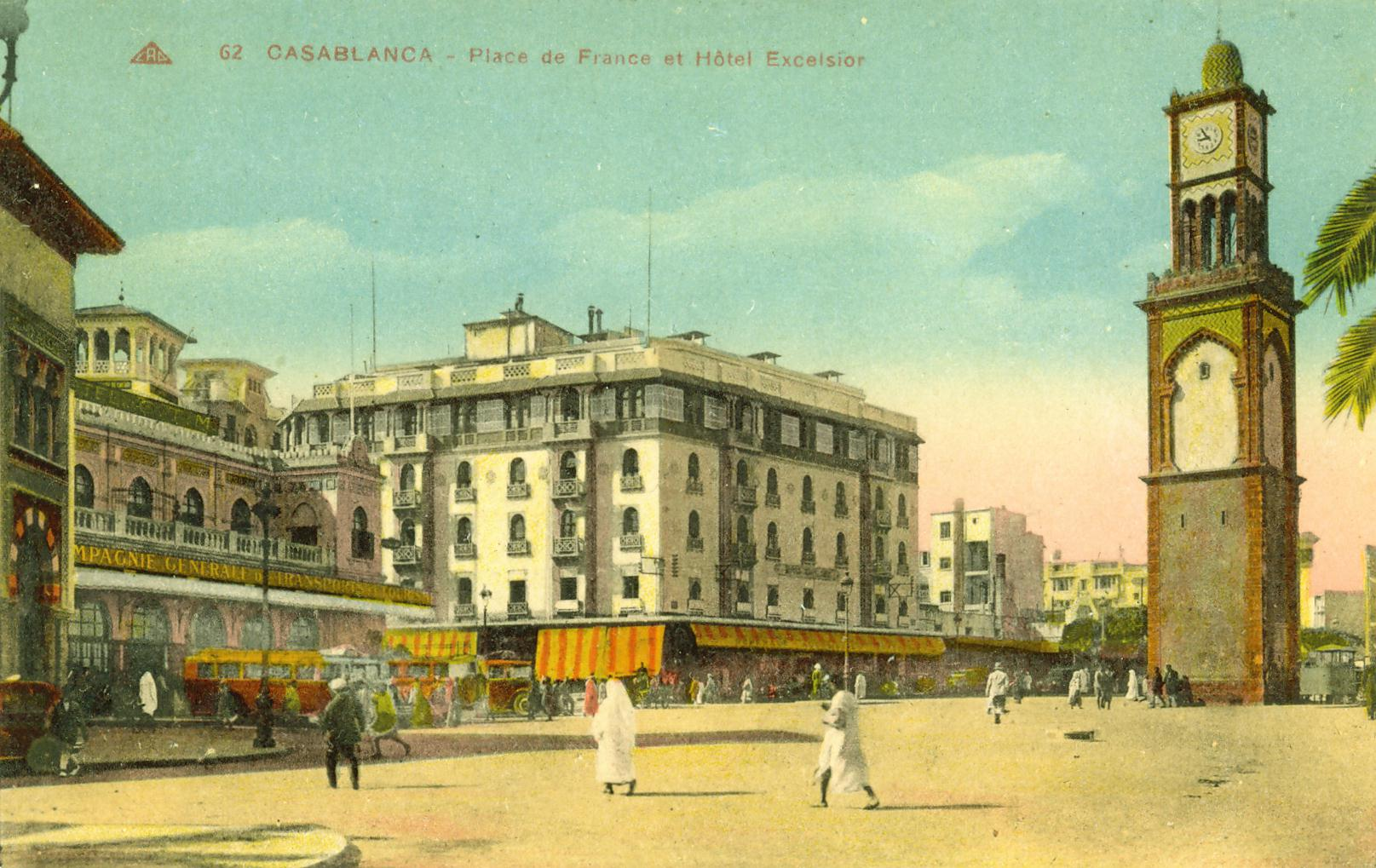
Hotel Excelsior and the Clock Tower in its previous position at Place de France (United Nations Square).

===== Hubous =====
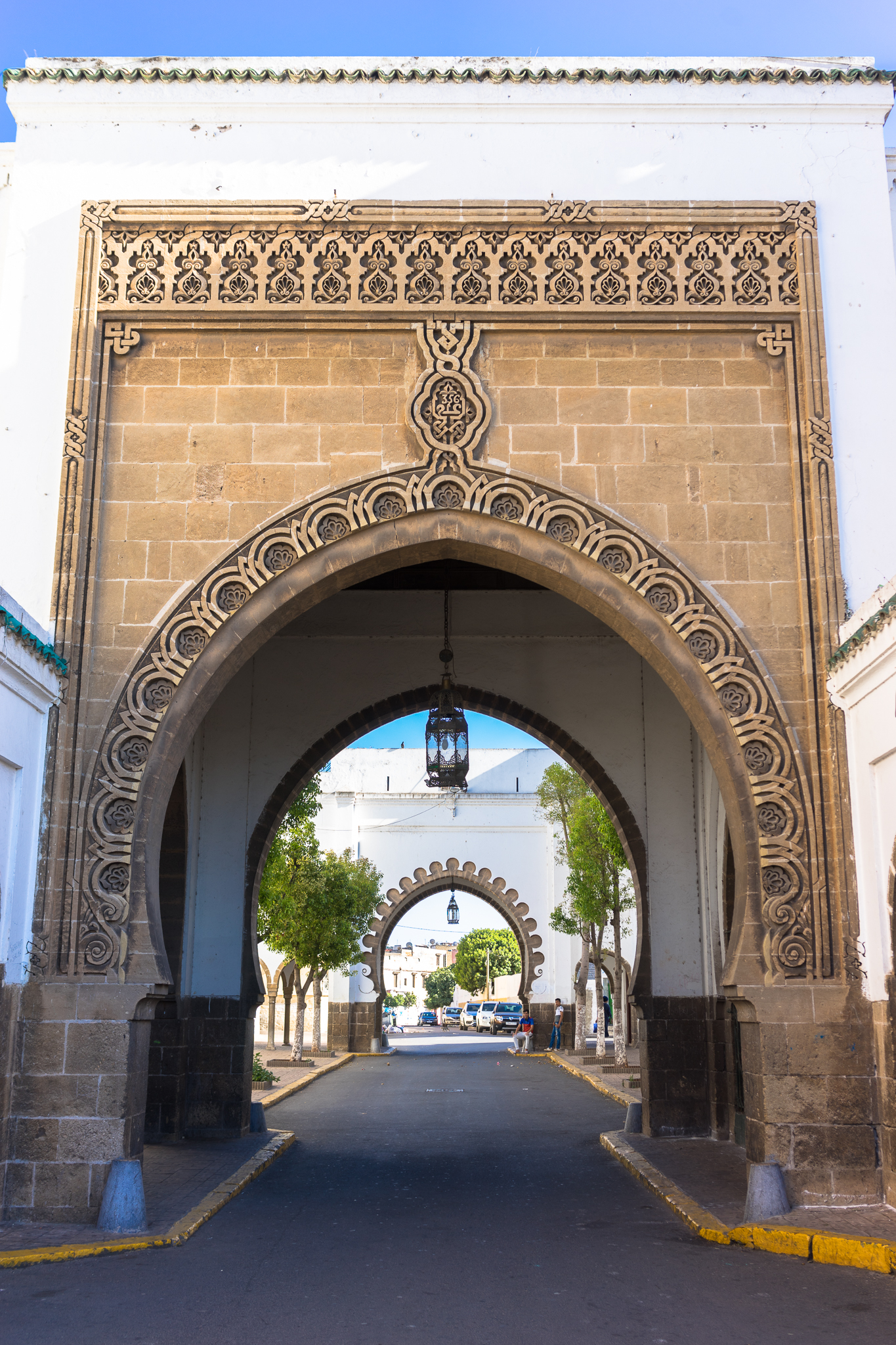
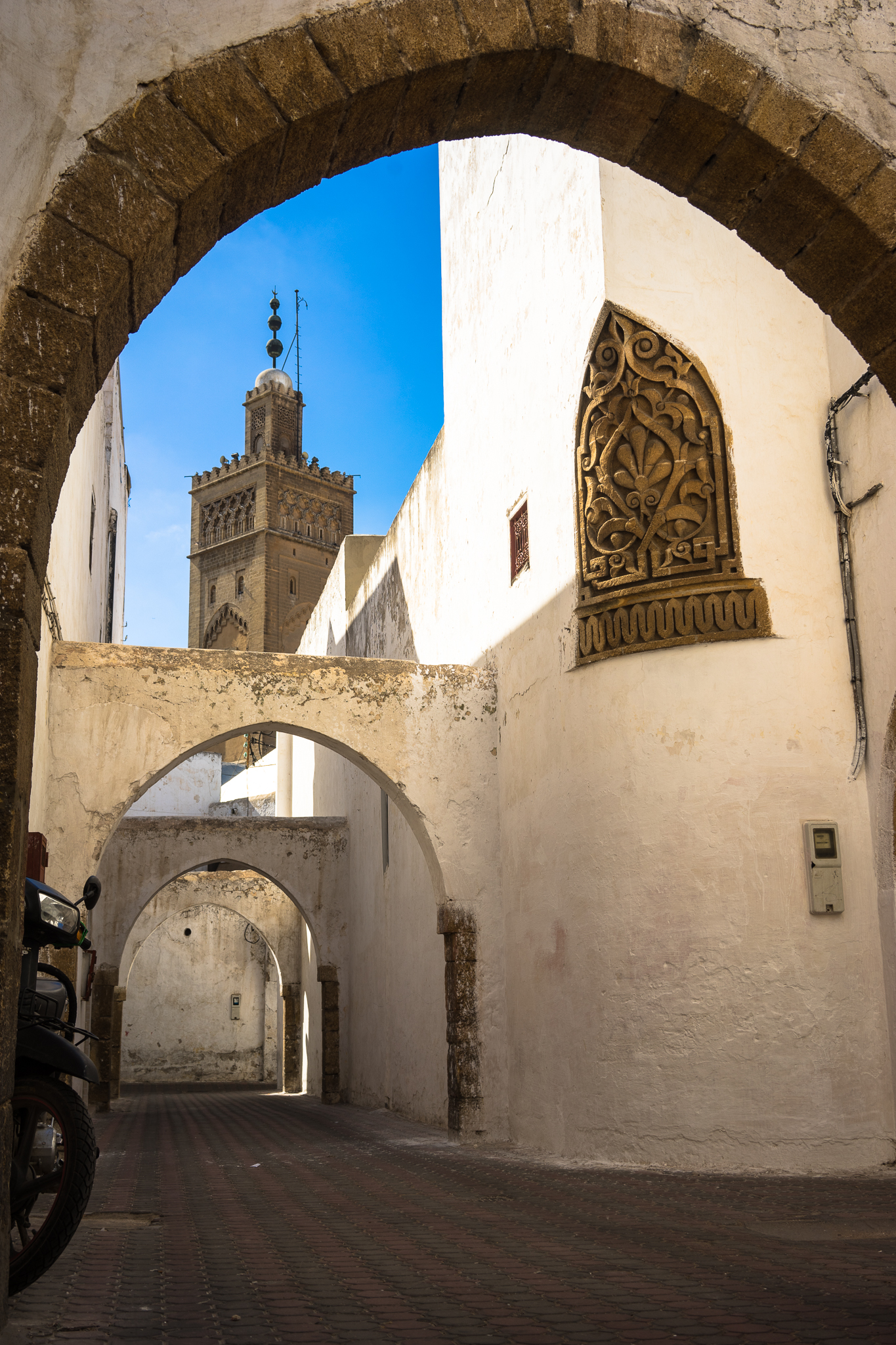
Some aspects of the Hubous neighborhood.

In 1916, four years after the official establishment of the French protectorate, Prost and Albert Laprade designed a nouvelle ville indigène—now known as the Hubous—a new medina near the sultan's palace to the east of the new center. On land given to the Ministry of Islamic Affairs by a Jewish businessman named Bendahan, the planners attempted to blend features of a traditional Moroccan city, as they saw it, with the principles of a cité-jardin and modern standards of sanitation and urban planning.

The French writer Louis Thomas, in Le Maroc de 1917, saw the experiment of the cité-jardin of the nouvelle ville indigène as offering a potential model for visitors from the 'bled', for the qaids and pashas of other cities.

===== Bousbir =====
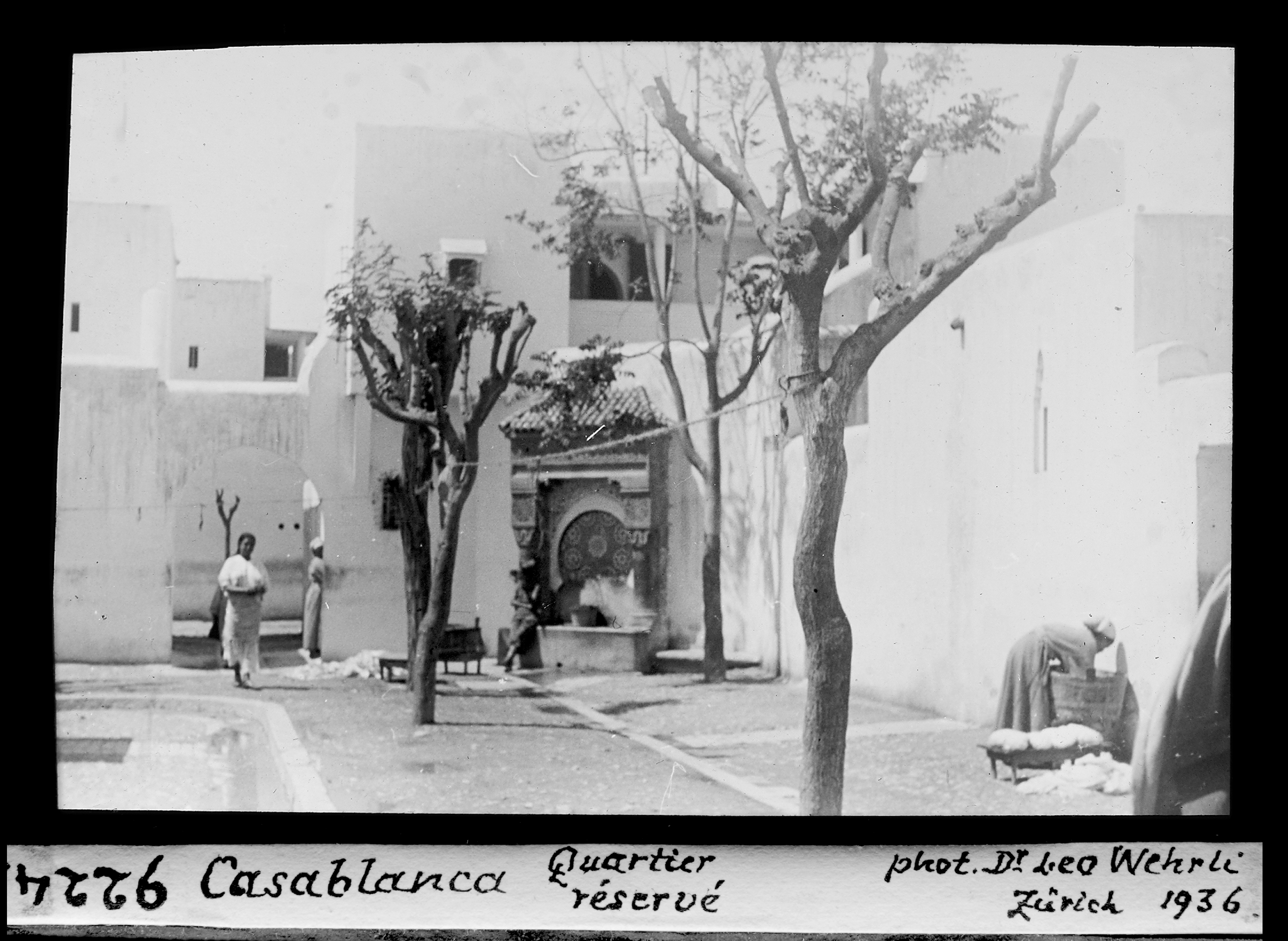
The Bousbir, a Yoshiwara-inspired colonial brothel district.

In the 1920s, the colonial administration created a quartier réservé (prostitution quarter) south of the Hubous that came to be known as Bousbir. It was inspired by the Yoshiwara in Tokyo and operated by a private company called La Cressonière. Albert Laprade first set up a rectangular area with an orthogonal street layout, while Auguste Cadet and Edmond Brion manipulated traditional Moroccan forms employed in the Hubous. It was a walled-off enclosure containing 175 residences, 8 cafés, and a dispensary, with regulated movement uniquely through a guarded gate. Up to 700 women—Muslims and Jews—lived in this veritable "prison." The colonists marketed the quartier réservé to tourists with Orientalist imagery until it was shut down in 1954.

== Art Nouveau, Art Deco, and Neo-Moorish ==
=== Interwar period ===
In addition to Henri Prost, Albert Laprade, Marius Boyer, Auguste Cadet, and Edmond Brion were some of the early planners and architects of the city.

The development of the ville nouvelle was fueled by investment by diverse patrons, including the Makhzani former minister of State Holdings Omar Tazi, the Jewish businessman Haim Bendahan, and the southern Amazigh pasha of Marrakesh Thami El Glaoui.

Jewish patrons constructed the overwhelming majority of the tallest buildings in Casablanca during the interwar period. In the view of Jean-Louis Cohen, the vertical thrust of construction led by Jewish patrons was "nothing less than a revenge over the [status of] dhimma. Being able to build the highest structures reflected the new condition of a fully emancipated Jewish bourgeoisie." One notable example of this trend is the Lévy-Bendayan Building designed by Marius Boyer.

The Suraqui brothers, Joseph and Elias, were notable architects in Casablanca. They came from a Gibraltarian Jewish family that moved to Algeria, where they were trained as surveyors. They contributed to the art deco and streamline moderne villas and apartment buildings in the city.

The former administrative square, now Muhammad V Square, is surrounded by buildings in a style called Neo-Moorish, which combines Mauro-Andalusi and Art Deco architecture. One of the first buildings to employ this style was Hotel Excelsior, built 1912–1914. It was also used in the Old Abattoirs, an industrial slaughterhouse renovated by Prost in 1922. Neo-Moorish elements were also present in private palaces and residences such as the Glaoui Building.

A patent style was often used in colonial administrative buildings, such as Wilaya Building and Mahkamat al-Pasha in the Hubous, with whitewashed lime plaster and green roof tiles.

The Arab League Park (formerly called Parc Lyautey) is the city's largest public park. On its edge is the Sacred Heart Church of Casablanca. It is no longer in use for religious purposes, but it is open to visitors and is a splendid example of Neo-Gothic architecture.

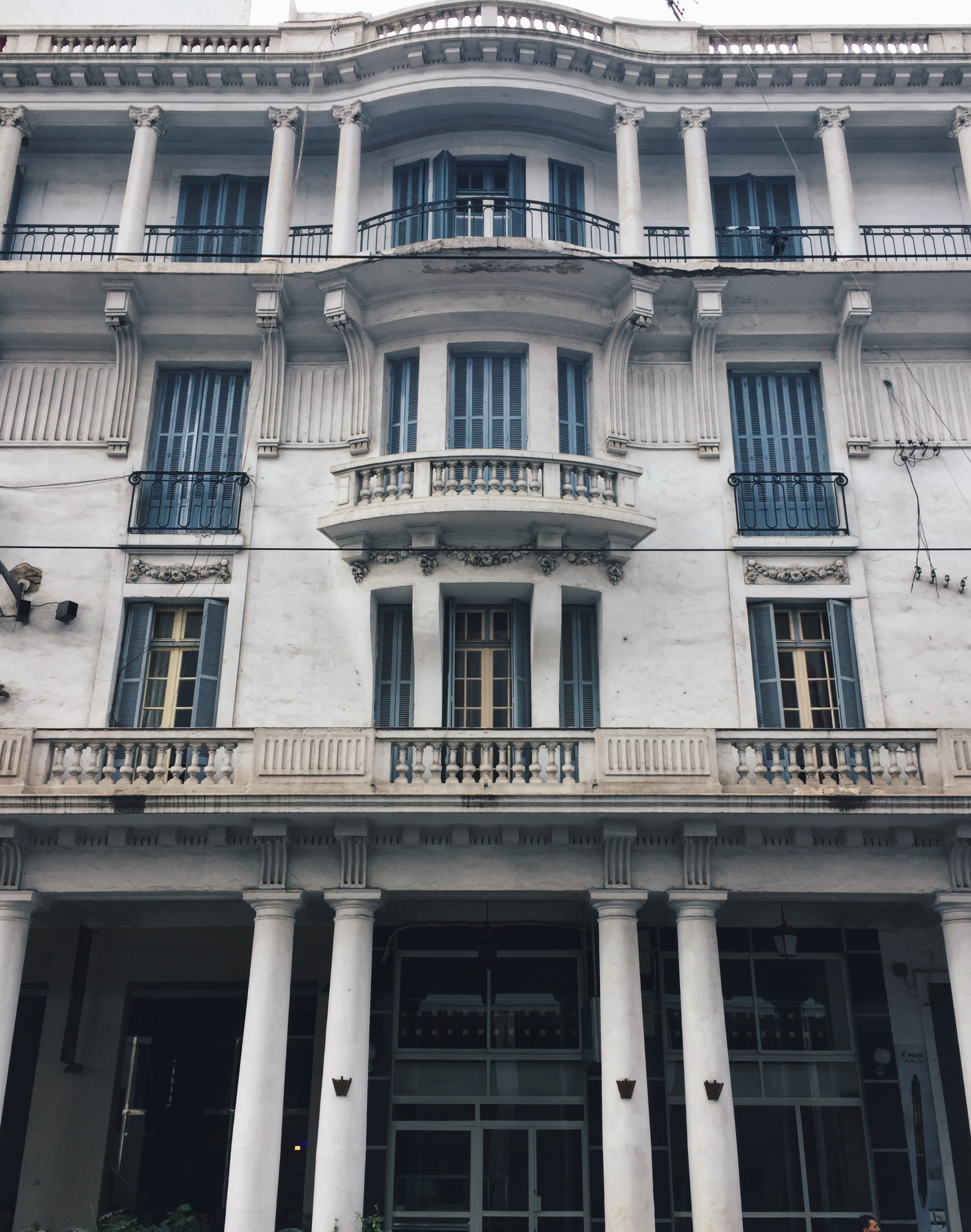
A building in French colonial style on Hassan II Blvd.

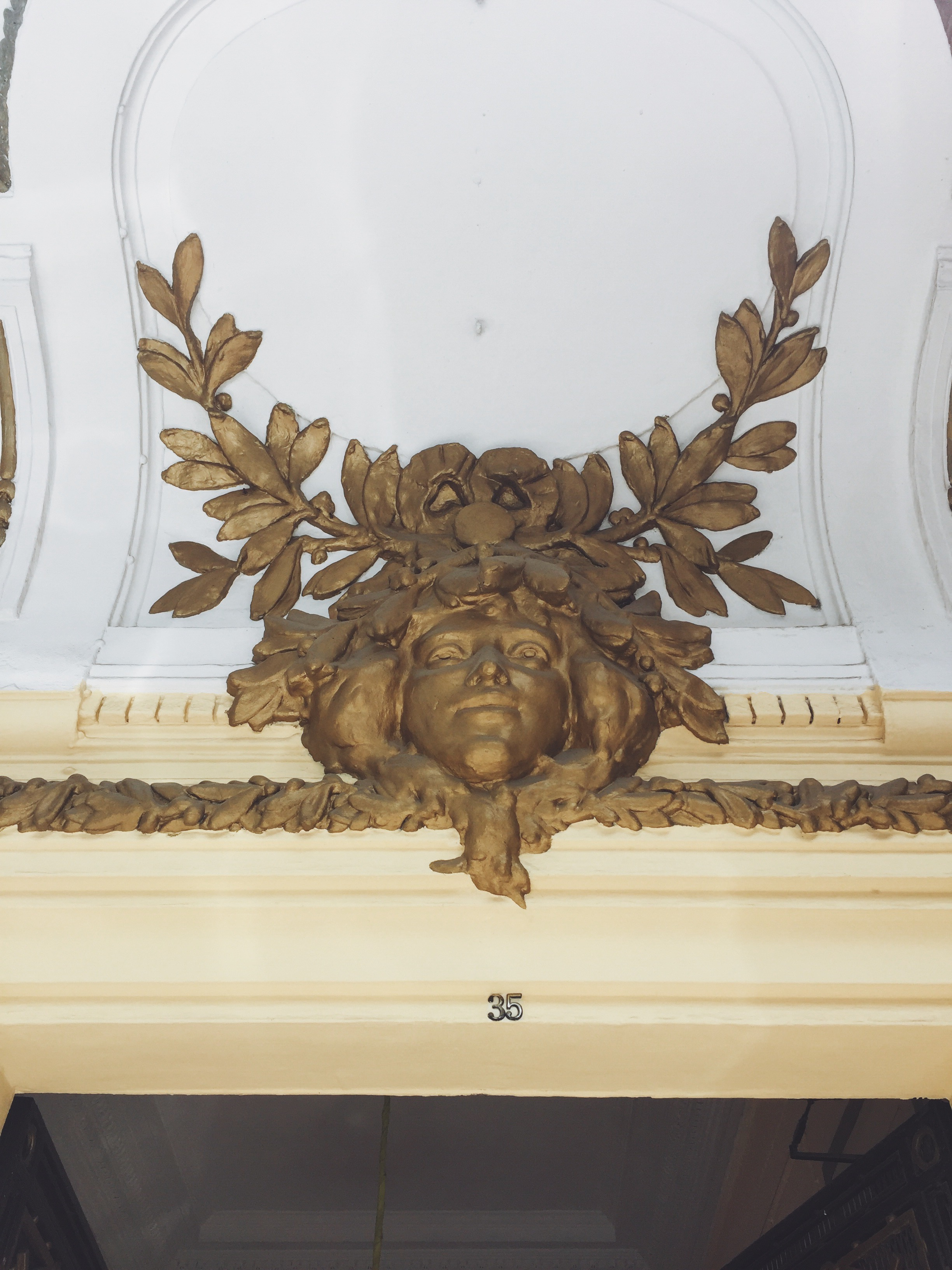
Art Nouveau decorative detail.

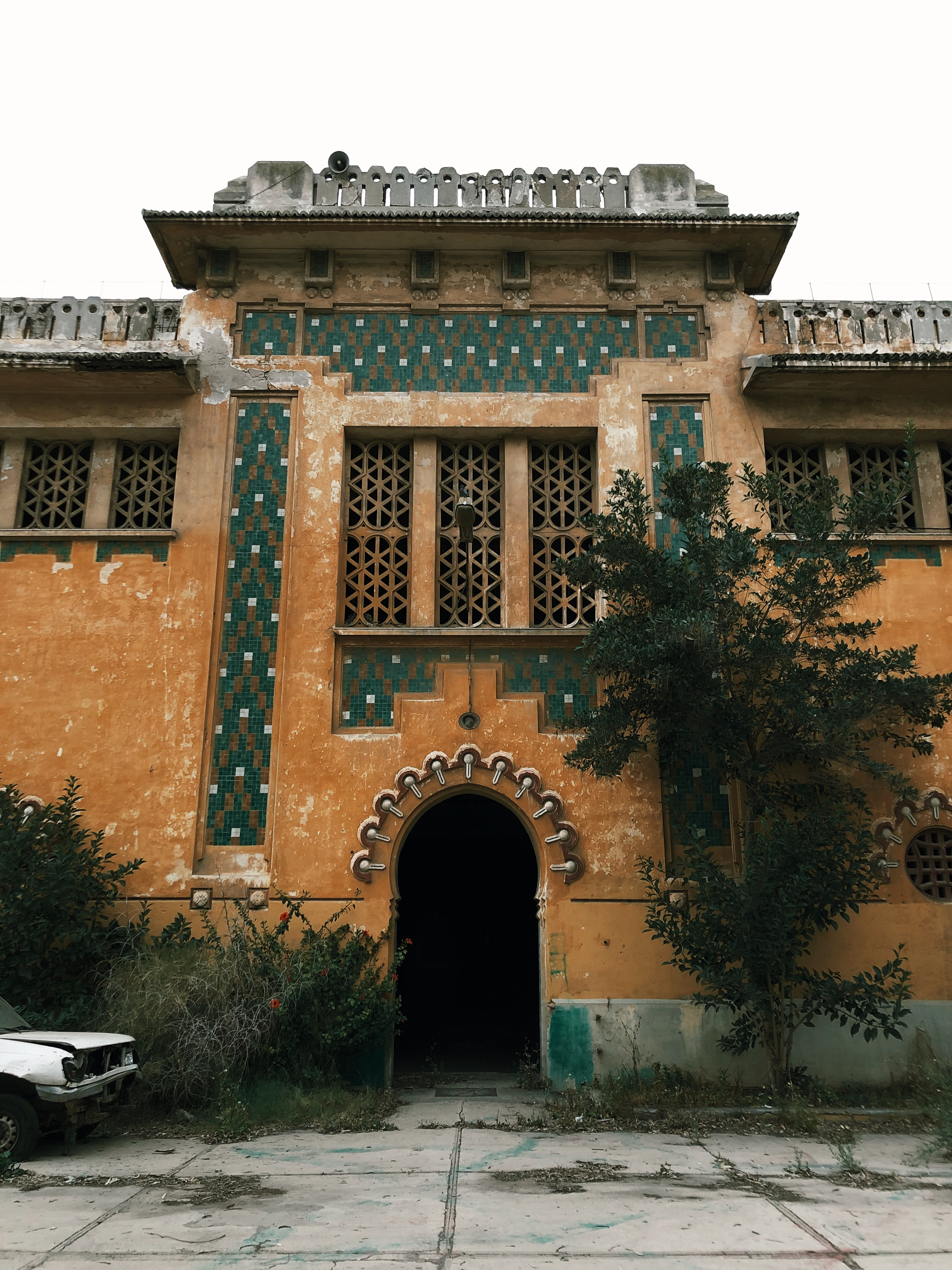
The Neo-Mauresque Old Abattoirs in Hay Mohammadi, renovated by Henri Prost in 1922.

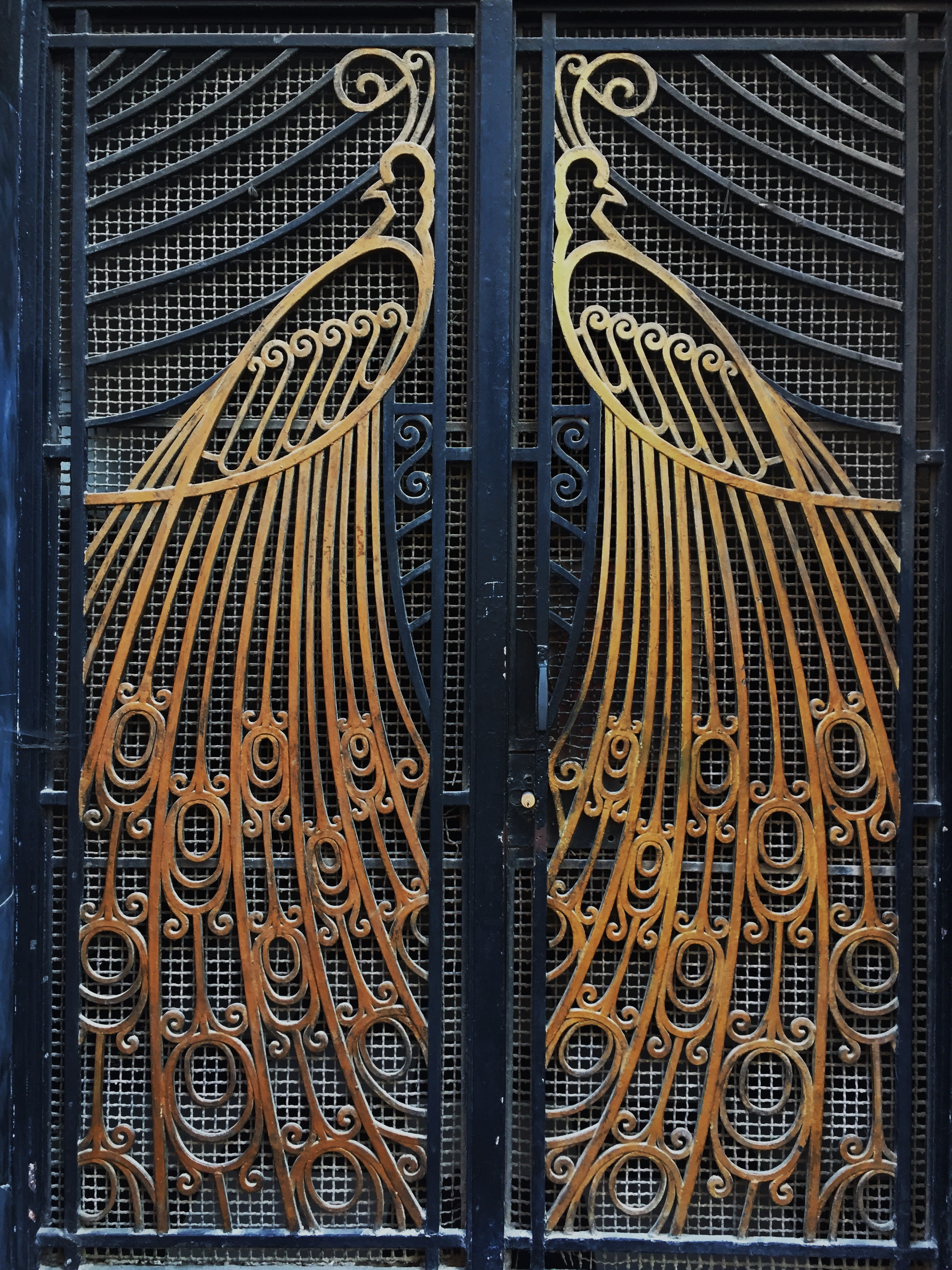
Wrought iron decorating a door. Marius BoyerMarius Boyer, 85 rue Colbert, 1929.

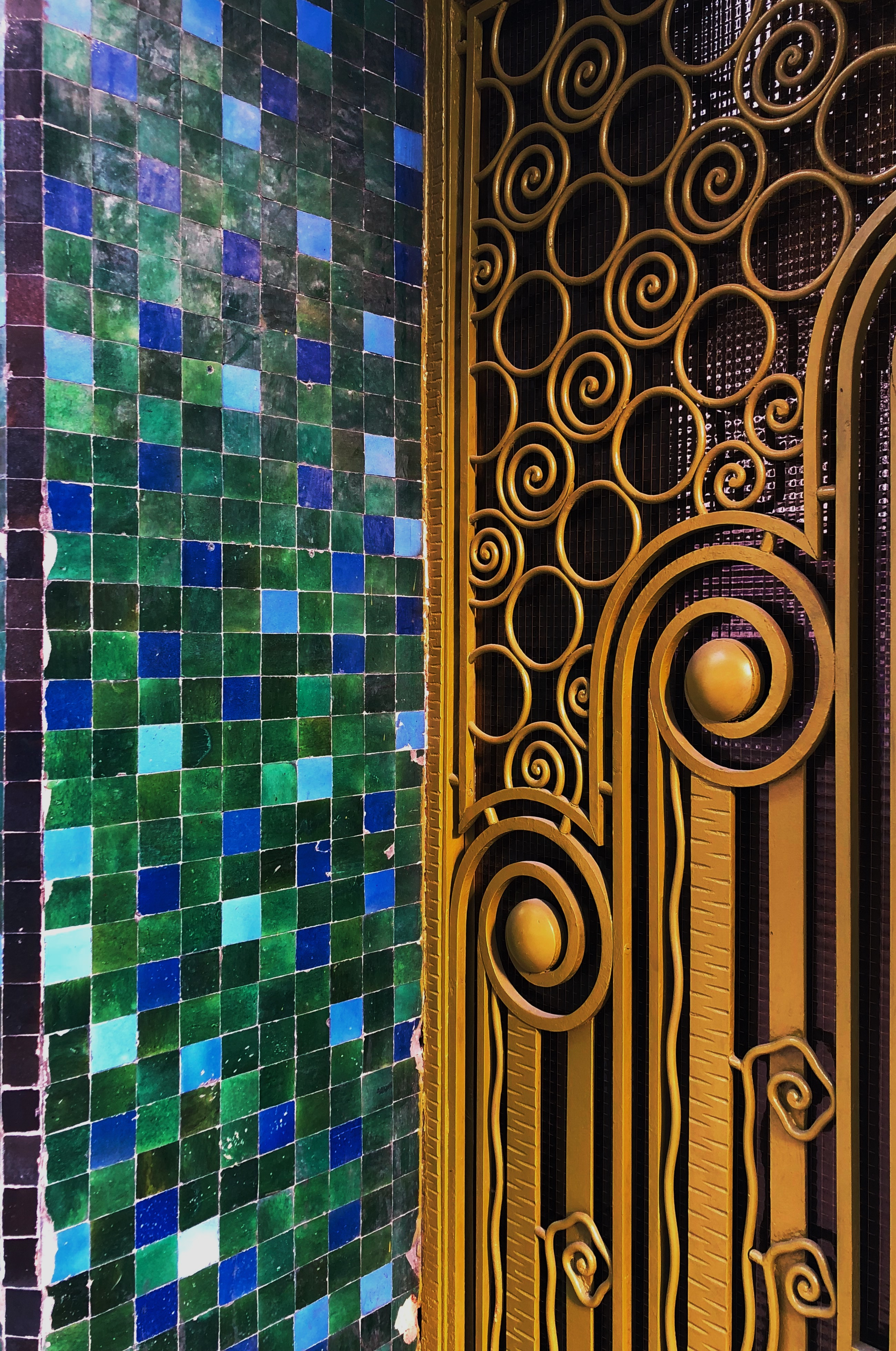
Art Deco blended with reinterpreted Moroccan decorative elements.

The French government described Casablanca as a "laboratory of urbanism." Morocco's permanent delegation to UNESCO submitted a nomination file to get Casablanca's 20th century architecture classified as a World Heritage Site. Casamémoire is an organization that has been working to protect and promote this architectural heritage since 1995.

== Modernism and Brutalism ==
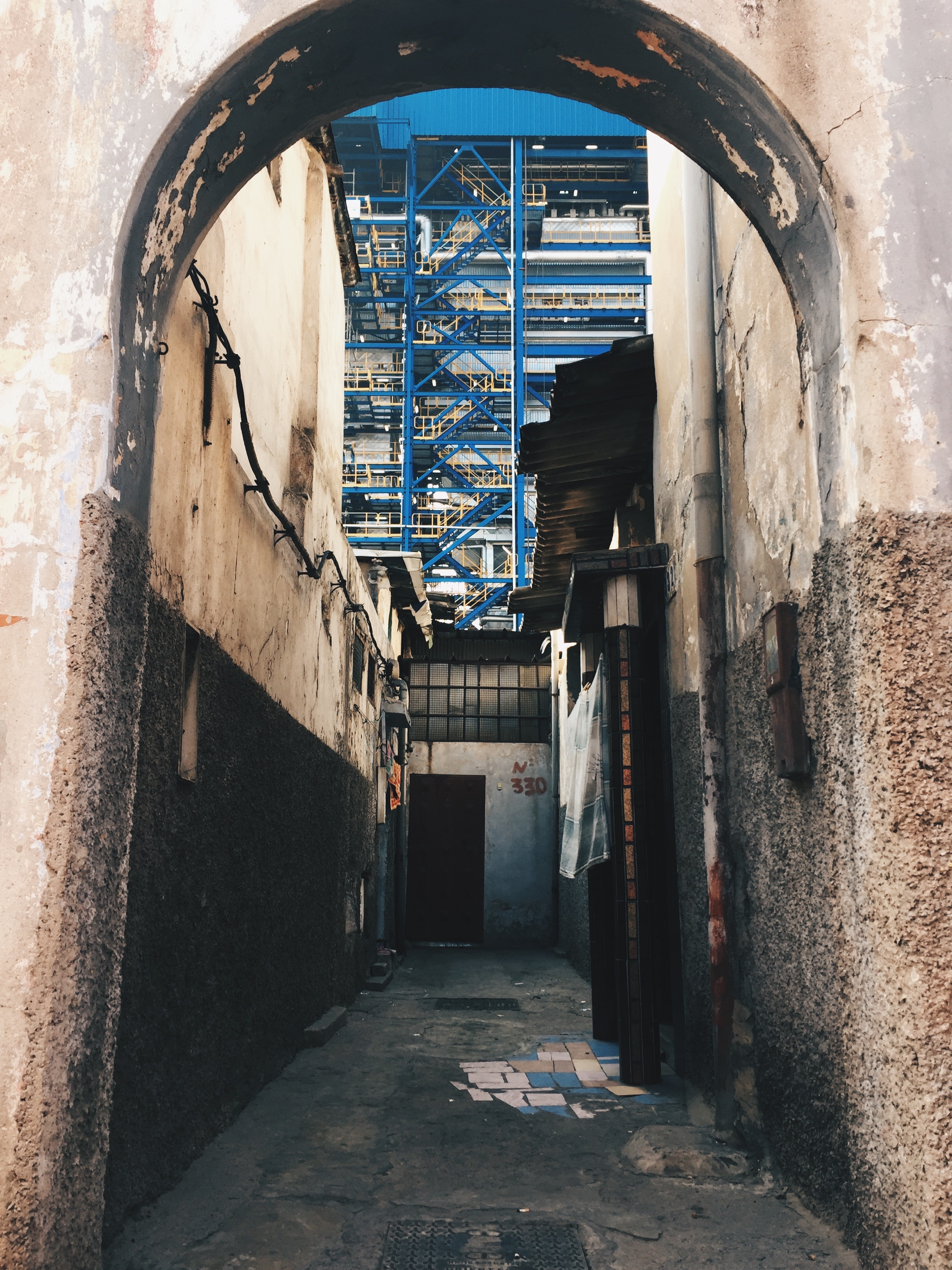
A view of the industrial Compagnie Sucriere Marocaine (COSUMAR) factory from within Edmond Brion's 1930s cité ouvrière indigène, meant to receive the company's laborers and simulate a traditional neighborhood.

Streamline Moderne, or paquebot style, with the aesthetic of ocean liners is present in the Bendahan Building, Villas Paquet, the Liberty Building, and others. Edmond Brion's Bendahan Building, completed in 1935, was an early example.

Casablanca was an early site of Americanization due to the allied landing during Operation Torch in 1942.

[Casablanca] rather resembles a Frenchman's idea of Chicago, complete with skyscrapers and Galeries Lafayette.

— Bernard Newman,

=== Ecochard's Plan ===
Michel Écochard, director of urban development from 1946 to 1953, changed Casablanca's urban plan from Prost's radio-concentric system to a linear system, with expanded industrial zones stretching east through Aïn Sebaâ toward Fedala. There was a focus on managing the city's rapid, rural exodus-driven urbanization through the development of social housing projects.

=== GAMMA ===
At the 1953 Congrès Internationaux d'Architecture Moderne (CIAM), ATBAT-Afrique—the Africa branch of Atelier des Bâtisseurs founded in 1947 by figures including Le Corbusier, Vladimir Bodiansky, and André Wogenscky—prepared a study of Casablanca's bidonvilles entitled "Habitat for the Greatest Number." Georges Candilis and Michel Ecochard, the presenters, argued against the doctrine that architects must consider local culture and climate in their designs. This generated great debate among modernist architects around the world and eventually provoked a schism.

Ecochard's collective of Modernist architects was called Groupe des Architectes Modernes Marocains (GAMMA), and initially included the architects George Candillis, Alexis Josic and Shadrach Woods. In the early 1950s, Écochard commissioned GAMMA to design housing that provided a "culturally specific living tissue" for laborers and migrants from the countryside. Sémiramis, Nid d’Abeille (Honeycomb), and Carrières Centrales were some of the first examples of this Vernacular Modernism. This was the first time the French Protectorate built housing for the colonized rather than the colonizers, and it did so to suppress the Moroccan Nationalist Movement, particularly after the 1952 protests following the assassination of the labor unionist Farhat Hached, which were centered in the bidonville of Carrières Centrales (now Hay Mohammadi). Ecochard's 8x8 meter model, designed to address Casablanca's issues with overpopulation and rural exodus, was pioneering in the architecture of collective housing.

View of the Atlantic Ocean through the panoramic windows of Villa Camembert, a private villa in Anfa Superieur.

Elie Azagury, the first Moroccan modernist architect, led GAMMA after Morocco regained its independence in 1956. Azagury—young, controversial, and an outspoken Communist—was active in Hay Hassani designing cités, modular public housing units, that combined elements of modern and vernacular architecture taking local culture and lifestyles into account. He and colleagues such as Jean-François Zevaco were also involved in designing experimental private villas in neighborhoods in western Casablanca such as Anfa and Ain Diab with inspiration from Richard Neutra and Oscar Niemeyer. Villa Suissa (now converted into a Paul café), Villa Benkirane, Villa Camembert and Villa Azagury are examples.

This generation of independence architects were inspired by the schools of Le Corbusier, Richard Neutra, Walter Gropius, Oscar Niemeyer, and others. Their architecture—and the work of Jean-François Zevaco in particular—was experimental, as evidenced in constructions such as the Vincent Timsit Workshops or the Sunna Mosque.

==== Schools ====
As access to education was tightly controlled under the French Protectorate, the educational system in Morocco became a focal point. Michel Ragon noted that only half of the Moroccan population had access to formal education, and so many new schools were built. Their architecture reflected a reëxaminaiton of the constitution of school campuses and classrooms. Zevaco built schools in Brutalist style, such as the Théophile Gautier School and the Tit Mellil Rehabilitation Center. Azagury, too, innovated in his designs for the Longchamp School and the Roches Noires School (now the Ibrahim Roudani School), experimenting with patios and reëxamining the traditional layout of a classroom. He also drew on his experiences in Europe and experimented with contrast in materials and lighting.

France persisted in its cultural involvement in Morocco through the Mission universitaire et culturelle française au Maroc, which built the Ernest Renan School (1957) and the Bizet School (1960), as well as public schools such as the Racine School (1951), and the Sidi Othman School (1973).

==== Public facilities ====
As the economy transformed, industrial buildings, such as the Postal Sorting Center at Mohamed Diouri Square and the Sidi Othmane Wholesale Market (1976–79) of Abdeslam Faraoui and Patrice de Mazières, were constructed according to new Brutalist principles of minimalism and efficiency.

Mourad Ben Embarek designed the Mohammed V International Airport and the Atlas Tower.

Under Hassan II, Casablanca went through two major "neo-Haussmanian" projects: the Hassan II Mosque and the Royal Avenue project.

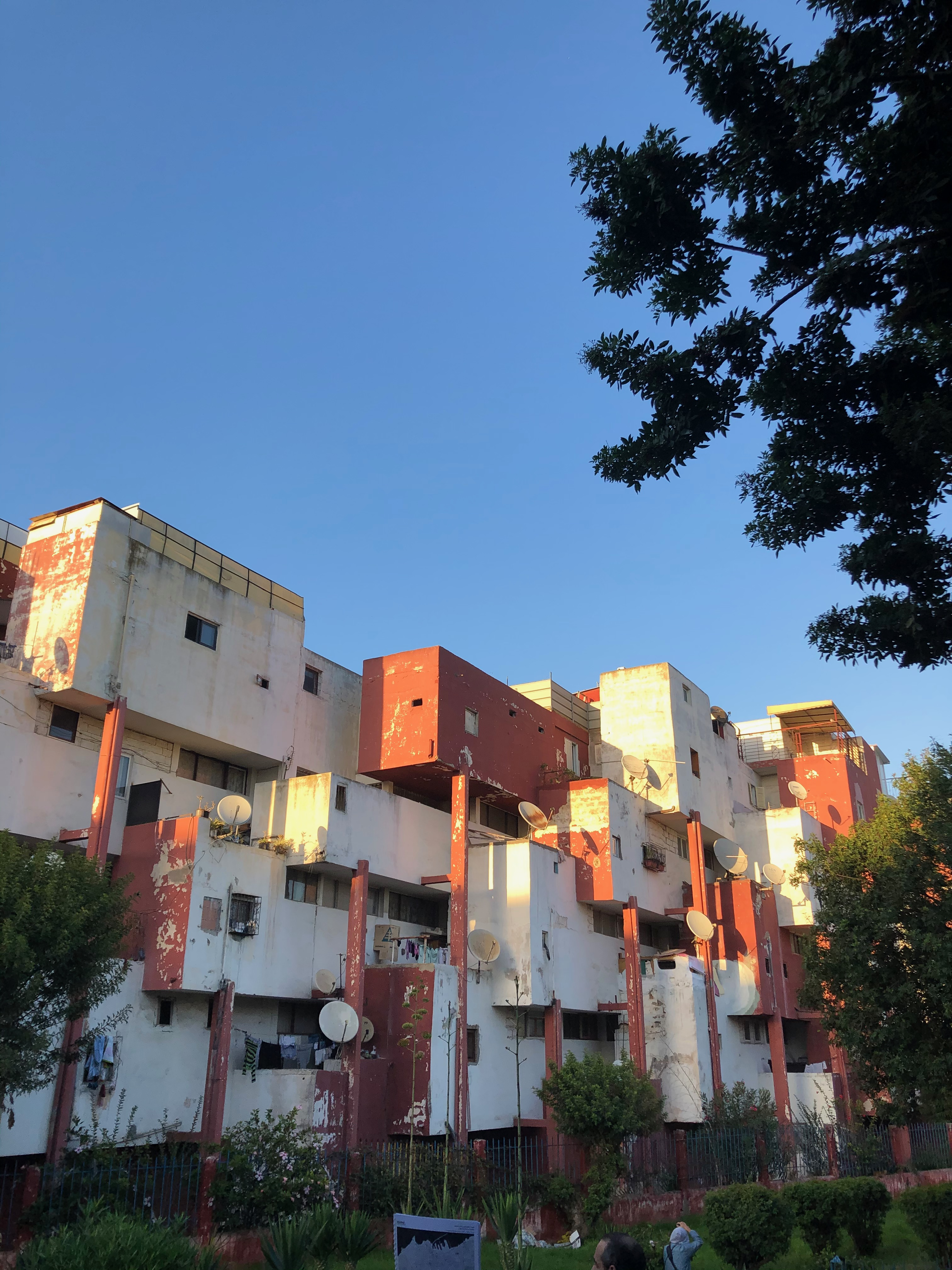
Vernacular modernism in GAMMA's Sidi Othmane Housing Development in Sidi Othmane, by André M. Studer and Jean Hentsch (c. 1952).

View from within the prayer hall of Jean-François Zevaco's 1966 Assuna Mosque, inspired by Niemeyer's 1943 Igreja da Pampulha.

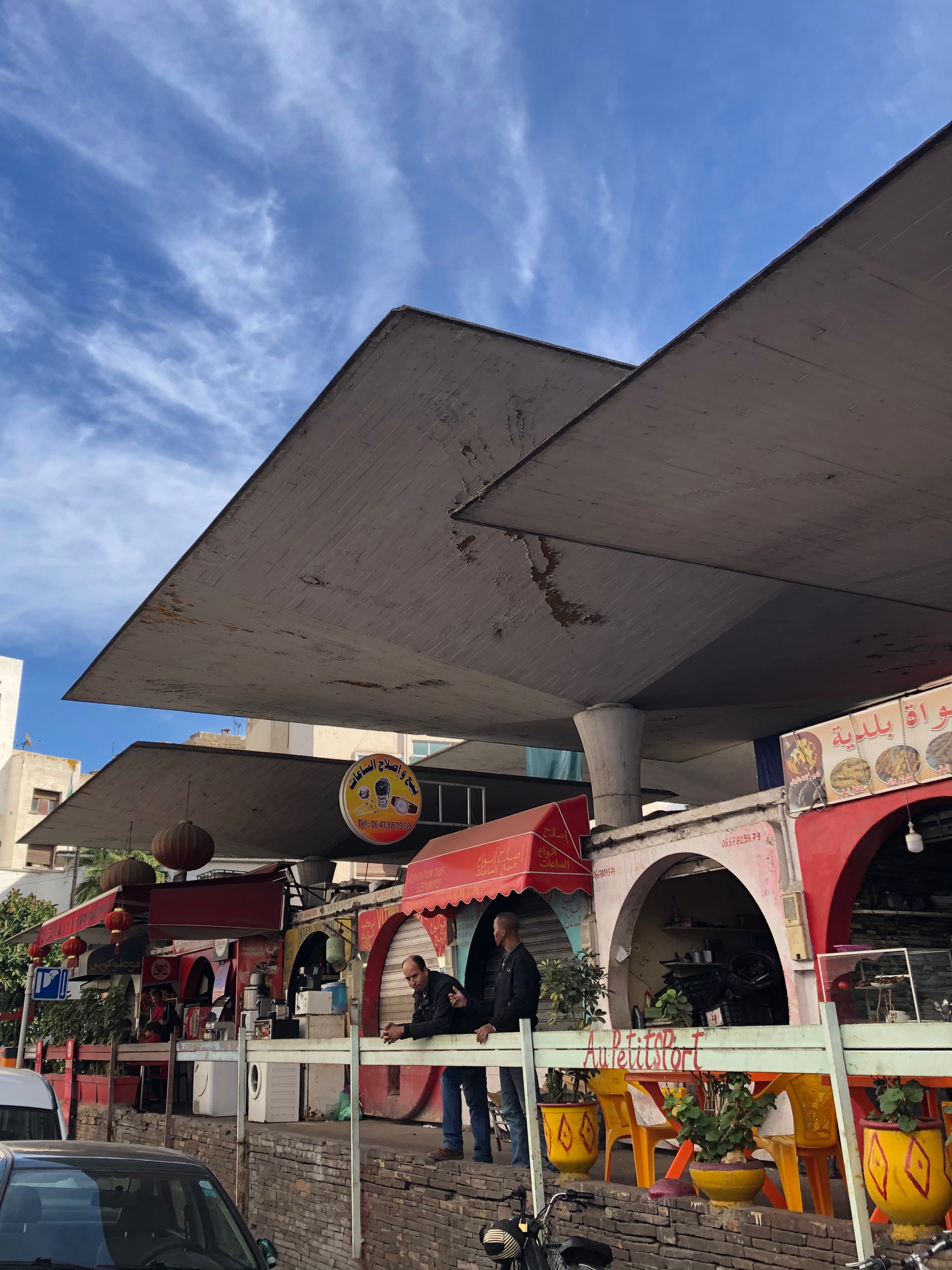
Zevaco's market on Agadir Street (1972).

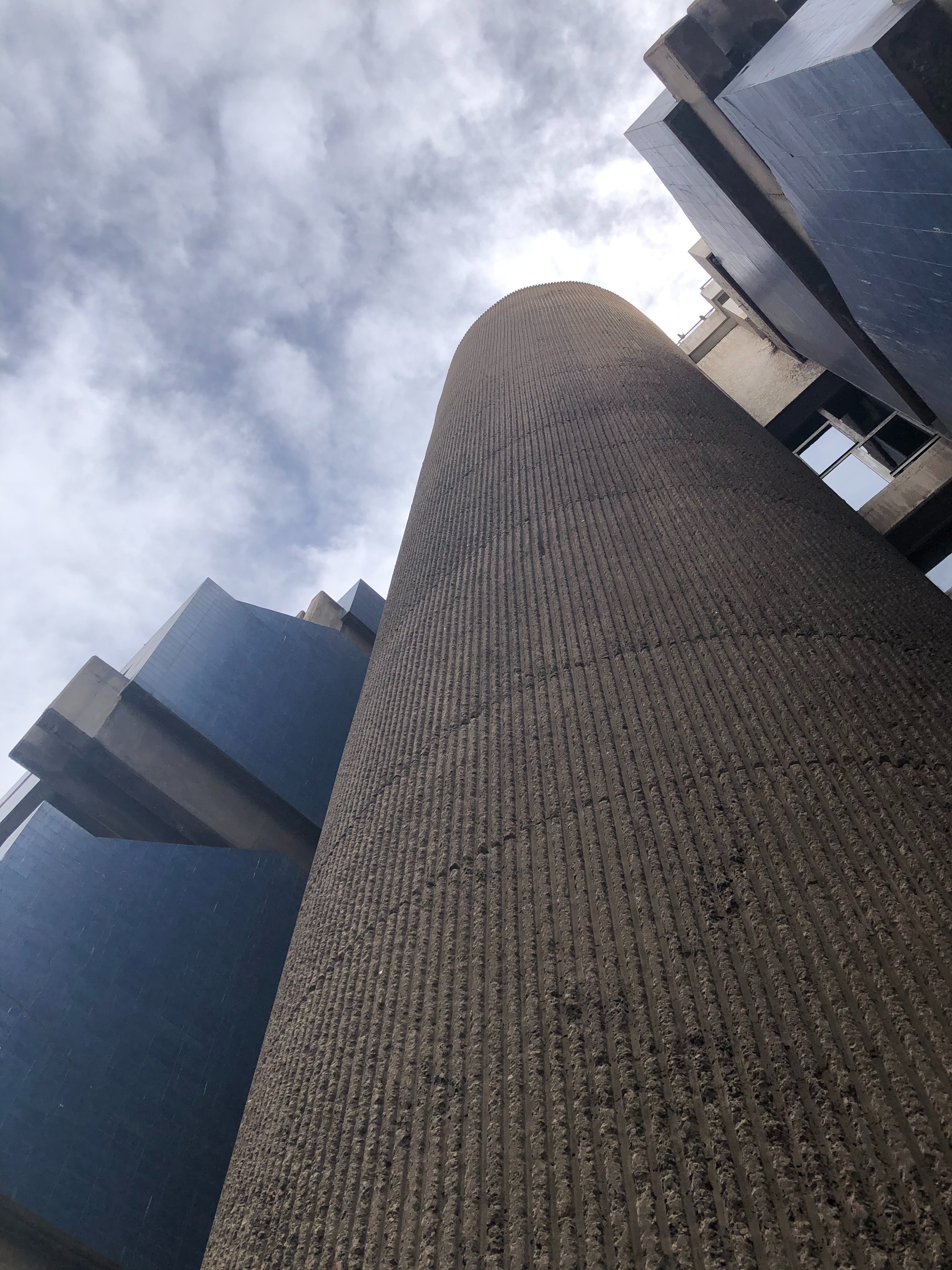
Textured concrete in Faraoui and de Mazières' 1979 Postal Sorting Center.

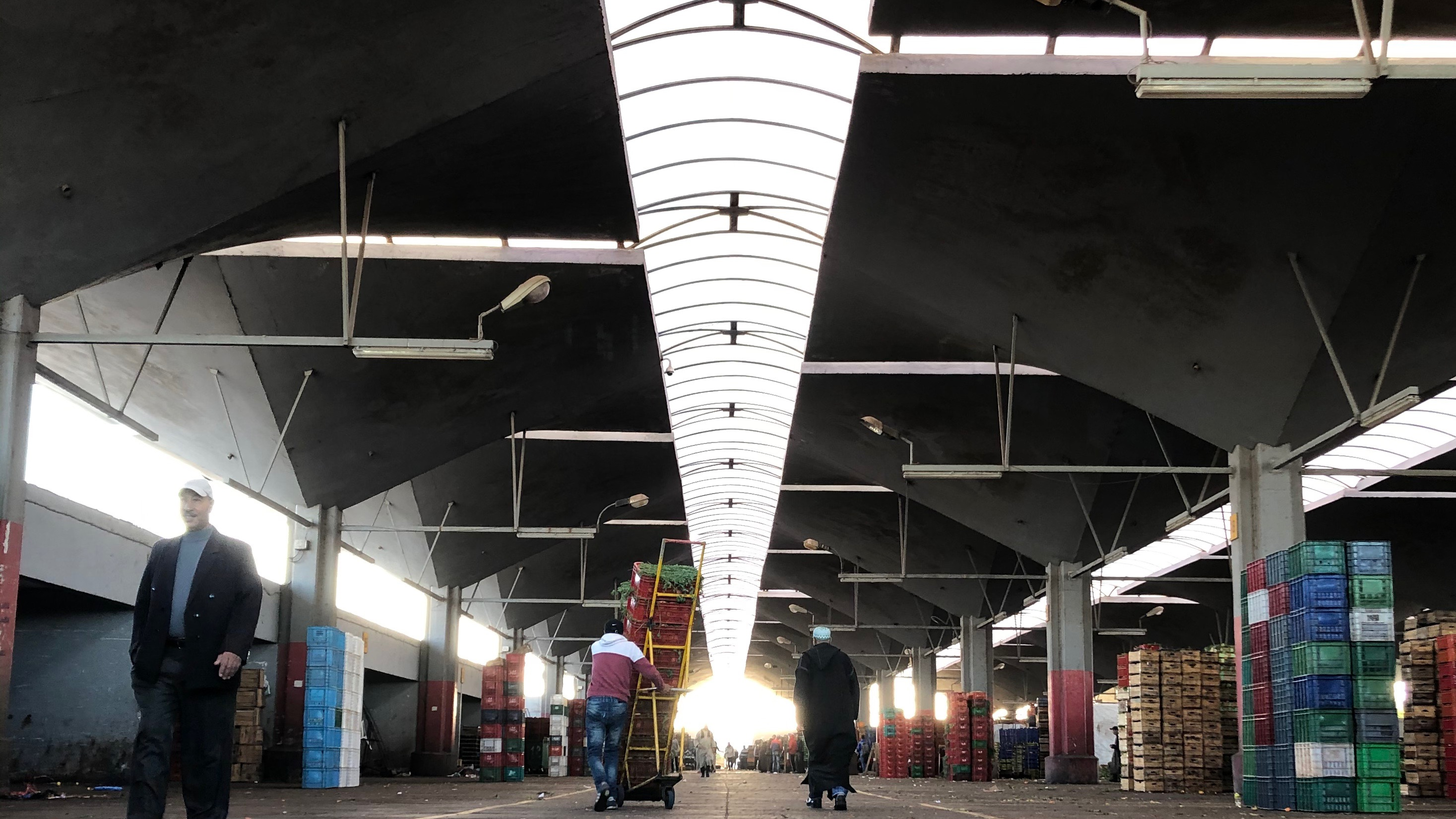
Faraoui and de Mazières' wholesale produce market in Sidi Othmane.

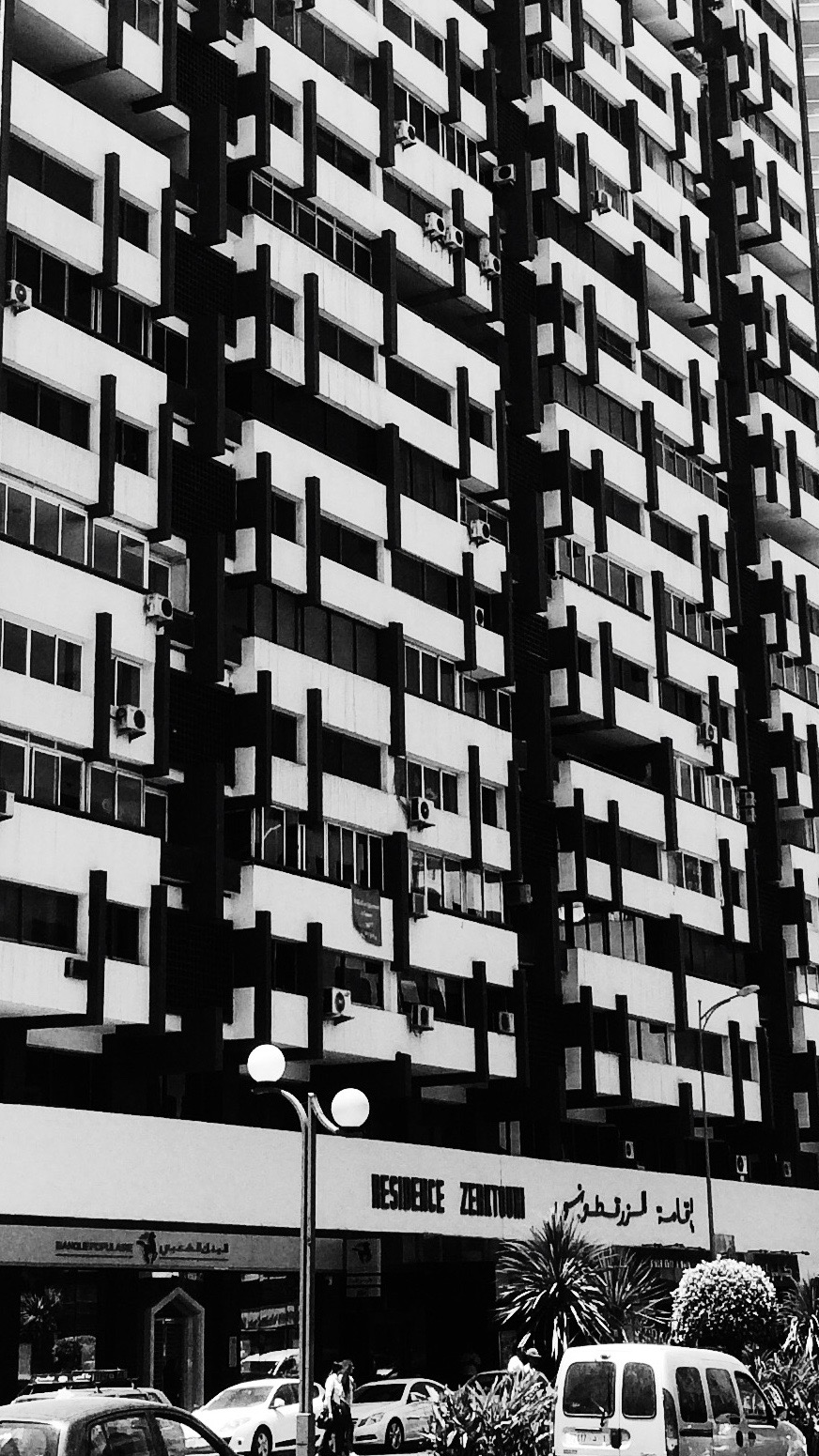
El Mehdi Laraki's 1980s Zerktouni Residence in Maarif.

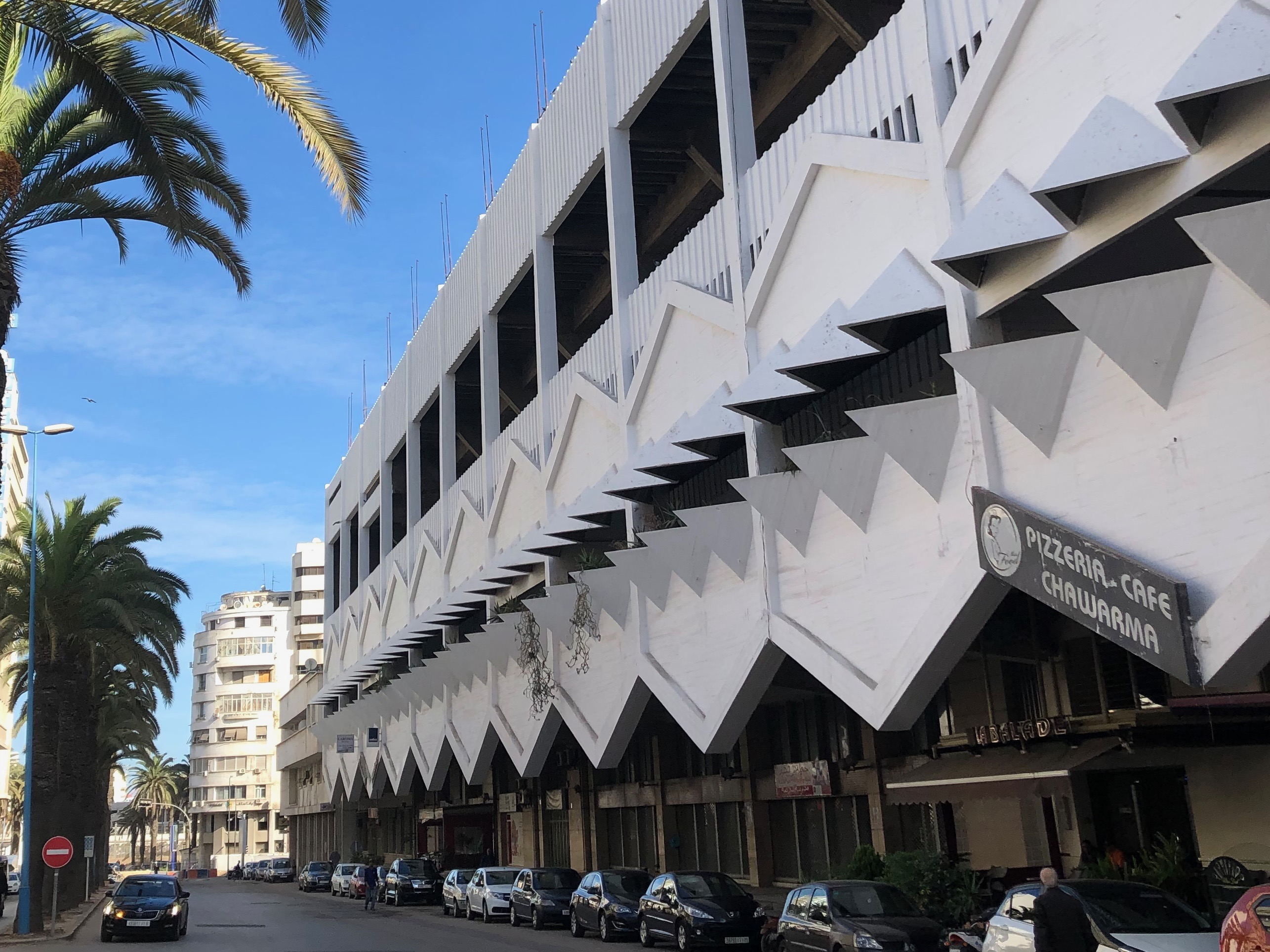
Larbi Benbarek Stadium by Abdelkader Bensalem and Domenico Basciano (1989).

== Neoliberal architecture ==
Koenraad Bogaert discusses recent urban projects in Casablanca in their relationship to the politics of Neoliberalism. Villes Sans Bidonvilles is a UN-Habitat program established in the aftermath of the 2003 Casablanca bombings for the resettlement of slum-dwellers. It works with organizations such as Al Omrane, Idmaj Sakan, Dyar Al Mansour, and the Agence Urbaine de Casablanca.

Casa Marina, Anfa Park, and Casanearshore, are business parks for offshoring.

The neighborhood of the former Casablanca–Anfa Airport transformed into Casablanca Finance City, part of a 2010 economic initiative oriented toward sub-Saharan African nations. Morphosis Architects designed the Casablanca Finance City Tower, with its textured aluminum facade. The French architecture firm Reichen et Robert is involved in this project as well as the Zenata "eco cité".

== Notable buildings and structures ==
=== Government and municipal ===
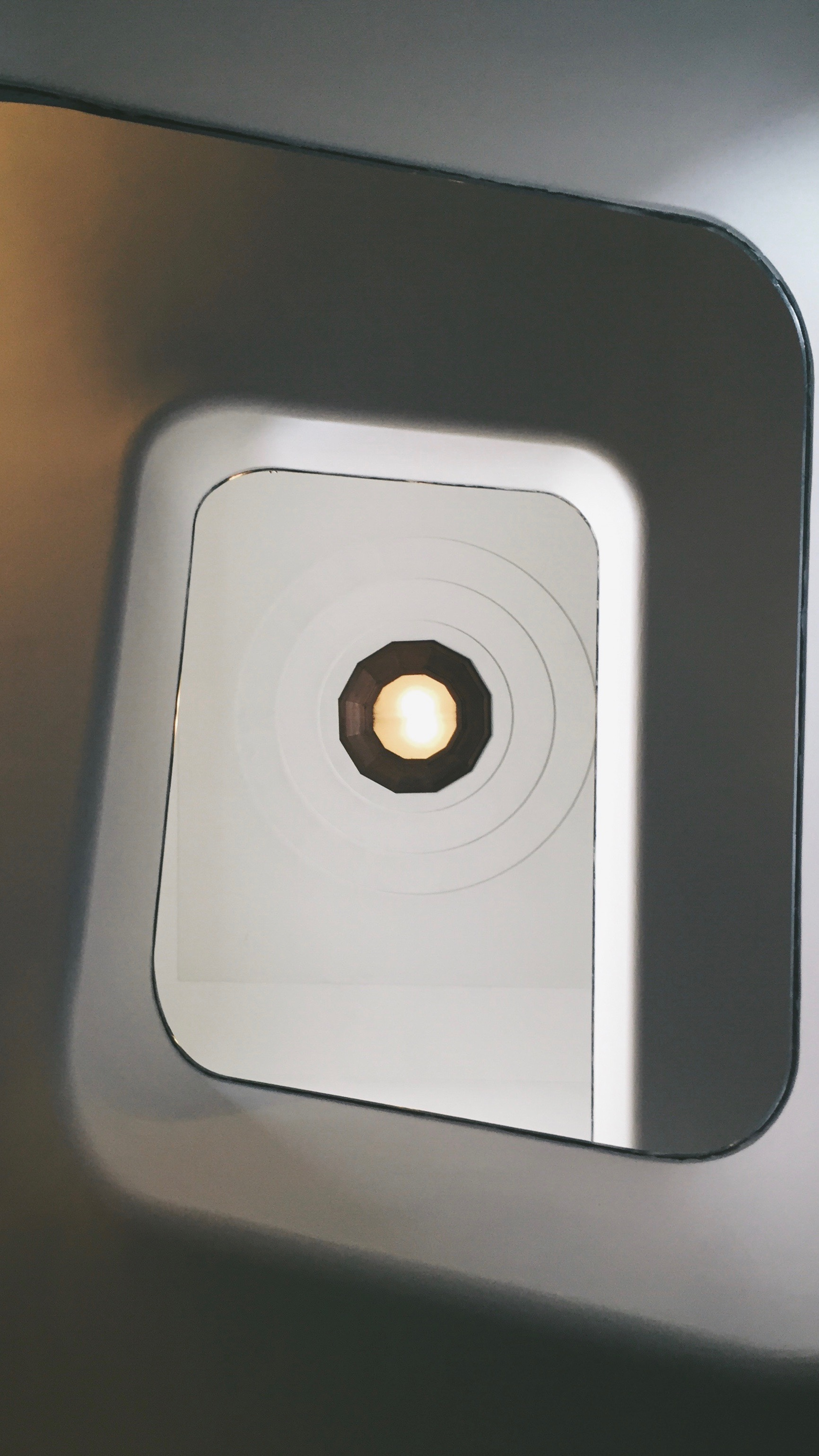
The staircase of the Bank Al-Maghrib building in Casablanca.

As the economic capital of Morocco, Casablanca is home to many government and municipal buildings. These buildings include but are not limited to:

- Palace of Justice (قصر العدالة, Palais de la justice)
- Wilaya Building (مقر الولاية, la Siege de la Wilaya), designed by Marius Boyer
- The Post Office (مكتب البريد, Bureau de Poste)
- Bank al-Maghreb (بنك المغرب)
- Old Abattoirs

=== Religious buildings ===
Casablanca is home to many religious buildings as part of its diverse heritage.

==== Synagogues ====
- Ettedgui Synagogue
- Beth-El Synagogue

==== Mosques ====
- Hassan II Mosque, designed by Michel Pinseau
- Al-Quds Mosque, formerly a Neo-Gothic church called Église de Sainte Marguerite
- Sunna Mosque, designed by Jean-François Zevaco
- Al-Mohammadi Mosque, designed by Edmond Brion and Auguste Cadet

==== Churches ====
- Church of San Buenaventura
- Church of the Sacred Heart (1930–1953), designed by Paul Tournon
- Notre-Dame de Lourdes Church

=== Education ===
Casablanca is home to a number of academic institutions, including:

- Lycée Ibn Toumart (1929), designed by Georges Jean Grel
- Lycée Lyautey

=== Transportation ===
- Casa-Port Railway Terminal
- Casa-Voyageurs Railway Station
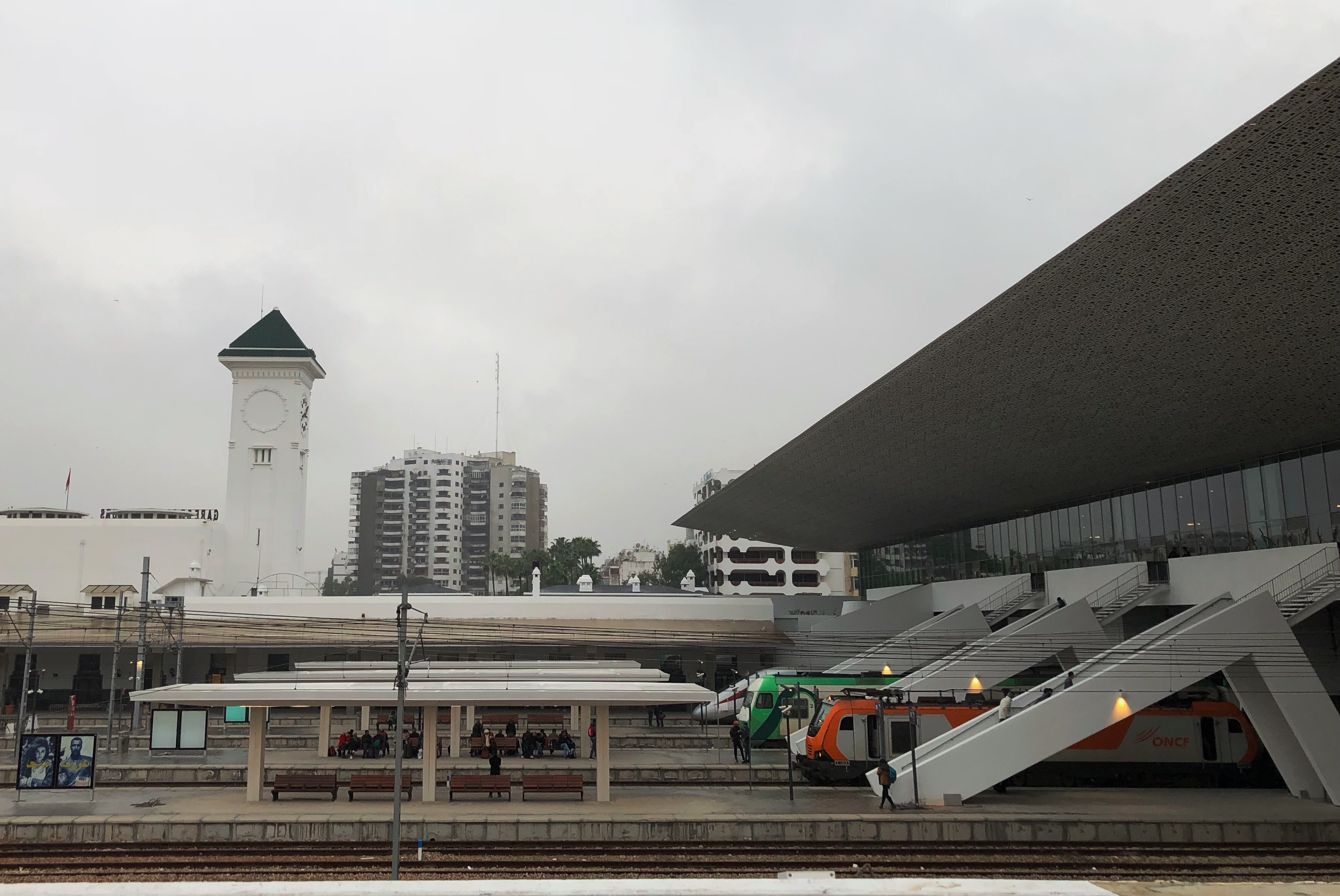
  The renovated Casa-Voyageurs Railway Station, by Yasser Khalil Studio and ABDR, completed in 2018 on the right, and the colonial era station on the left.
- Casablanca Tit Mellil Airport
- Mohammed V International Airport

=== Cinemas and theaters ===
- Cinema Rialto
- Cinema Lynx
- Ciname Empire
- Cinema ABC
- Cinema Vox
- Grand Theatre of Casablanca
- Municipal Theater of Casablanca (1922–1984)

Hippolyte Joseph Delaporte's 1932 Neo-Mauresque Maret Building.

=== Residential buildings ===
==== Apartment buildings ====
- Maret Building
- Liberty Building
- IMCAMA Building
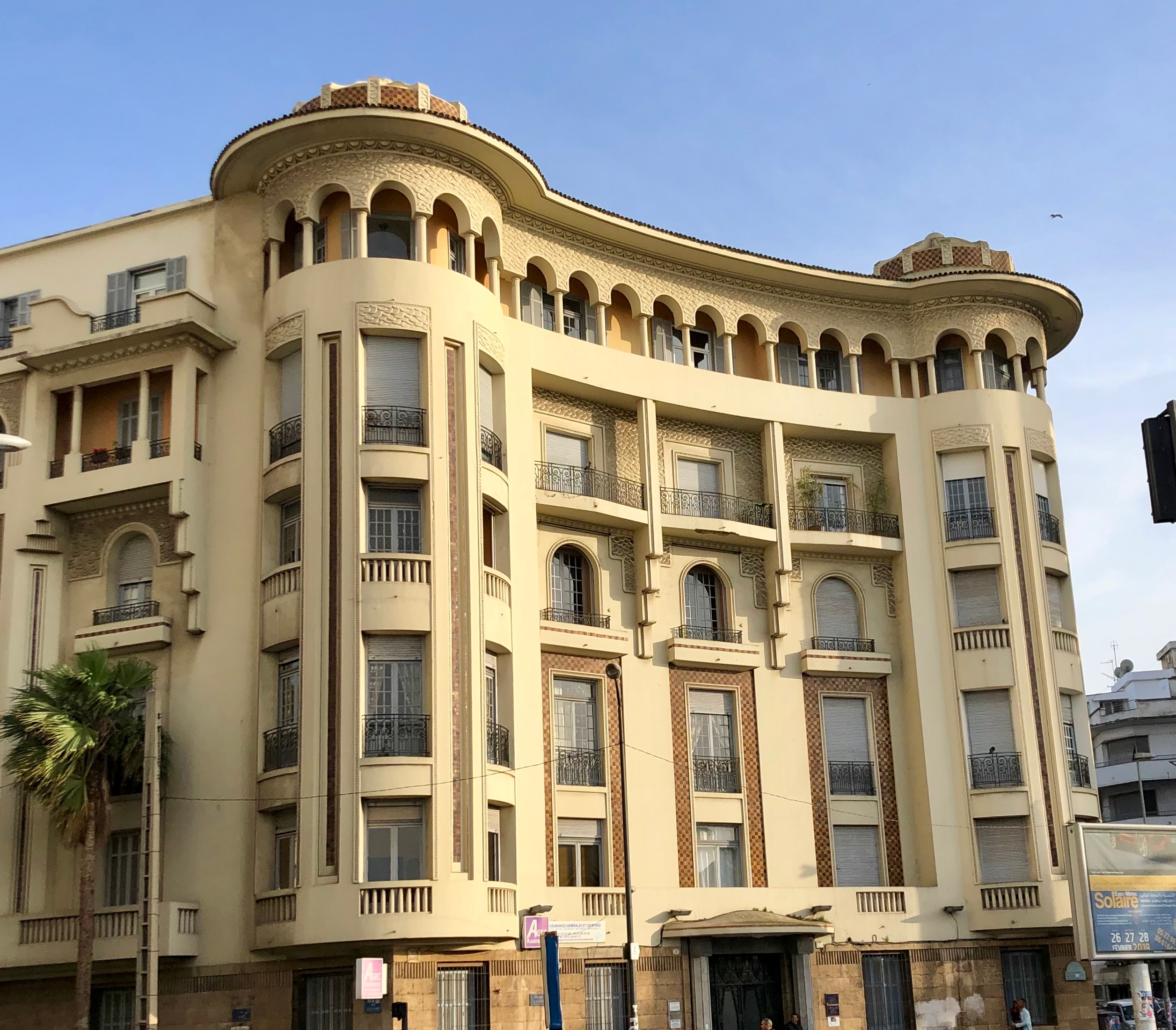
  The Société Immobilière de Casablanca et Maroc or IMCAMA Building (1928) designed by Albert Greslin.
- Maréchal Améziane Complex
- Glawi Building
- Assayag Building

==== Private villas ====
- Villa Zevaco
- Villa Camembert
- Villa Suissa
- Villa Azagury
- Villa Moqri

=== Sports ===
- Mohammed V Athletic Complex
- Larbi Benbarek Stadium
- La Casablancaise
- Vélodrome de Casablanca
- Orthlieb Pool (demolished)

=== Skyscrapers ===
- Liberty Building
- Atlas Tower
- Habous Tower
- Novotel
- Sofitel
- Twin Center
- Casablanca Finance City Tower

== Preservation of architectural heritage ==
Casamémoire is an organization dedicated to the promotion and protection of Casablanca's architectural heritage.

MAMMA. is dedicated to the appreciation and protection of Casablanca's Modernist and Brutalist architecture.

== See also ==
- List of monuments in Casablanca
- Moroccan architecture
- Architecture of Fez
- Landmarks of Marrakesh
