= Al-Mohammadi Mosque =

Mosque in Casablanca, Morocco

- مسجد المحمدي
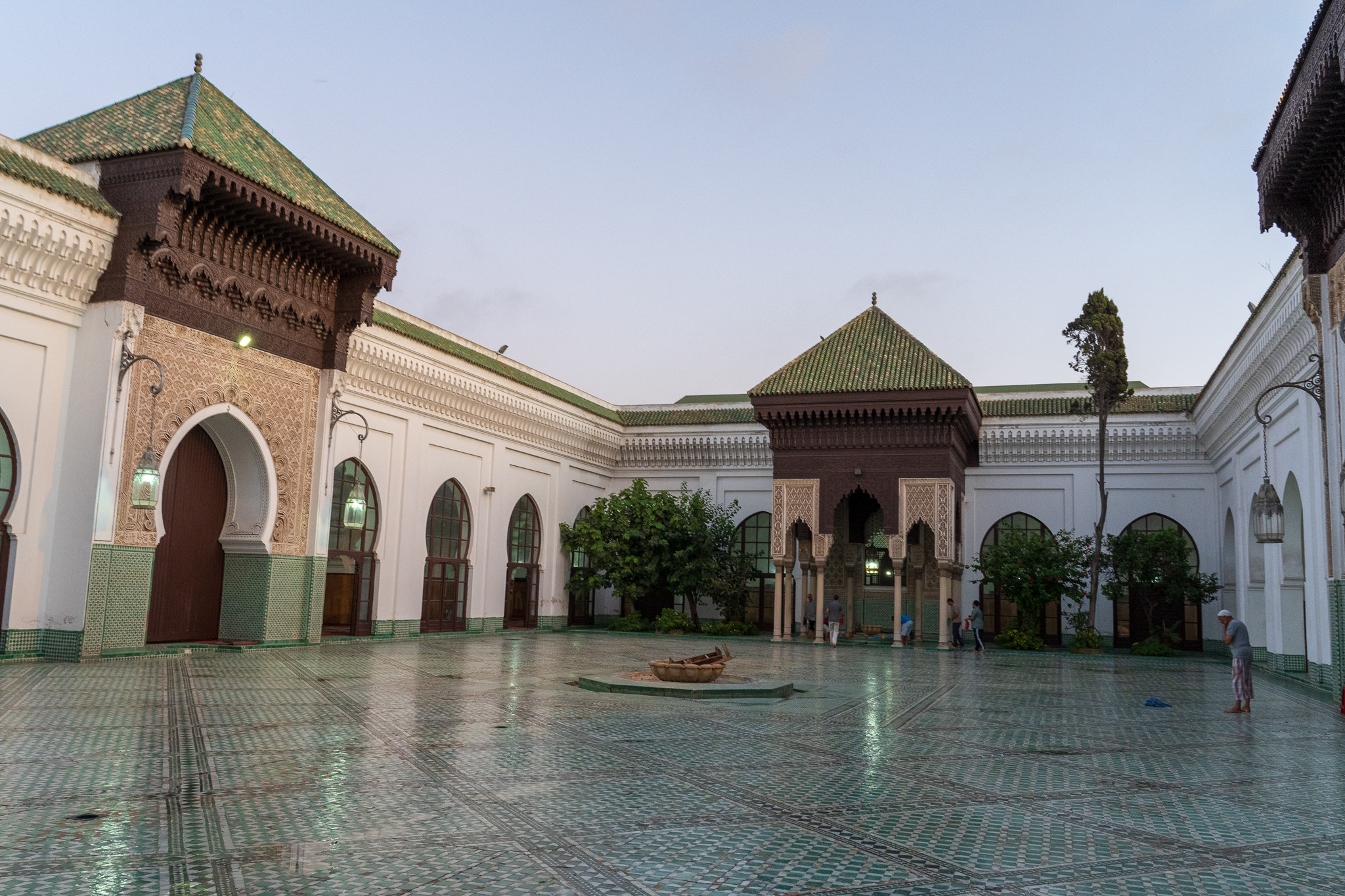

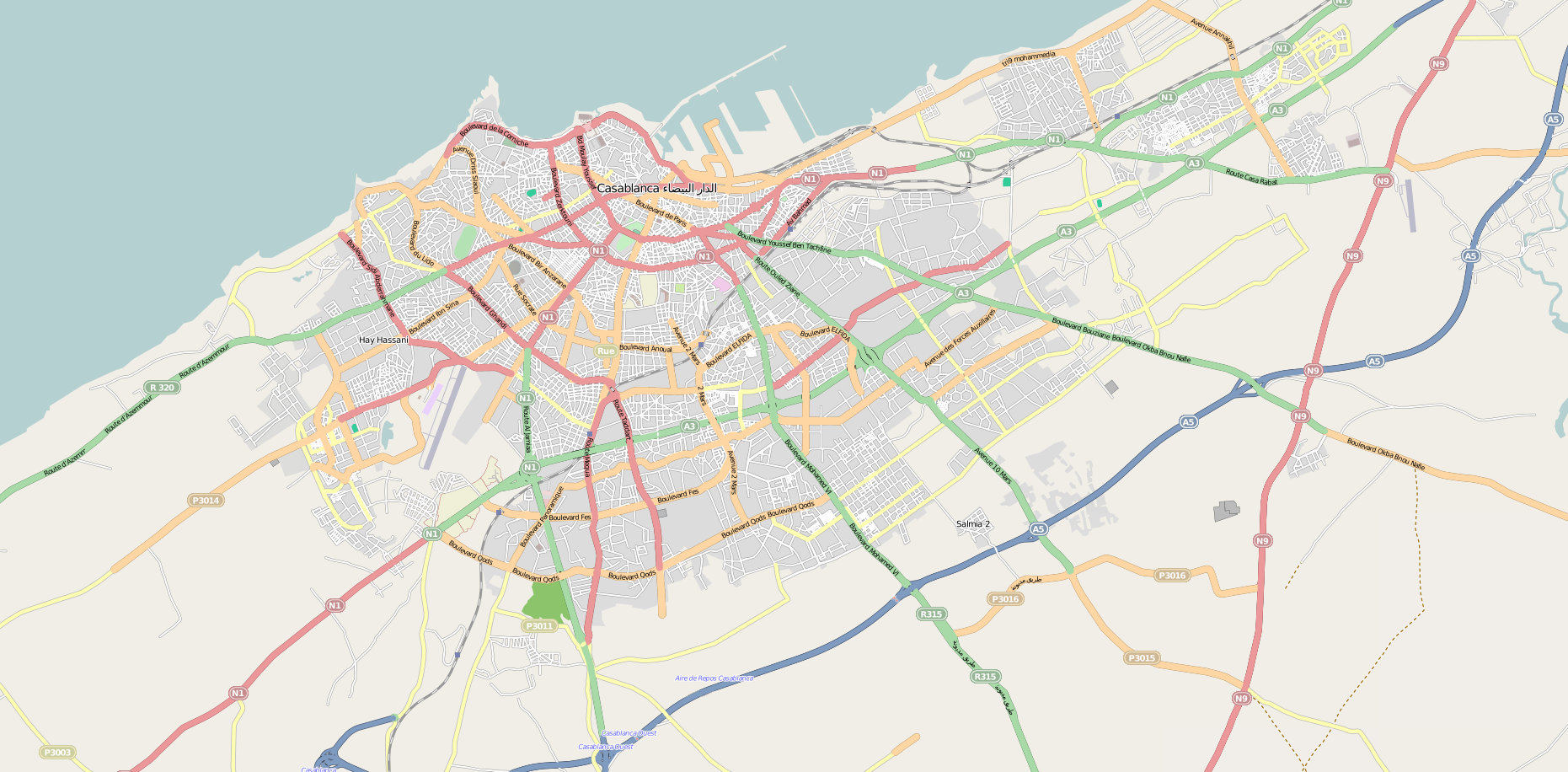
- Location within Greater Casablanca

Location
- Municipality: Casablanca
- Country: Morocco
- Coordinates: 33°34′34.7″N 7°36′21.8″W

Architecture
- Architect: Auguste Cadet
- Type: mosque
- Style: Moroccan
- Founder: Mohammed V
- Established: 12 June 1936
- Groundbreaking: 30 June 1934

Specifications
- Capacity: 8,000 worshippers
- Interior area: 3,600 m^{2} (39,000 sq ft)

Al-Mohammadi Mosque (Arabic: مسجد المحمدي) is a large mosque in the Habous quarter of Casablanca, Morocco. It was built circa 1935 and its construction was sponsored by Sultan Mohammed V, after whom it is named.

== History ==
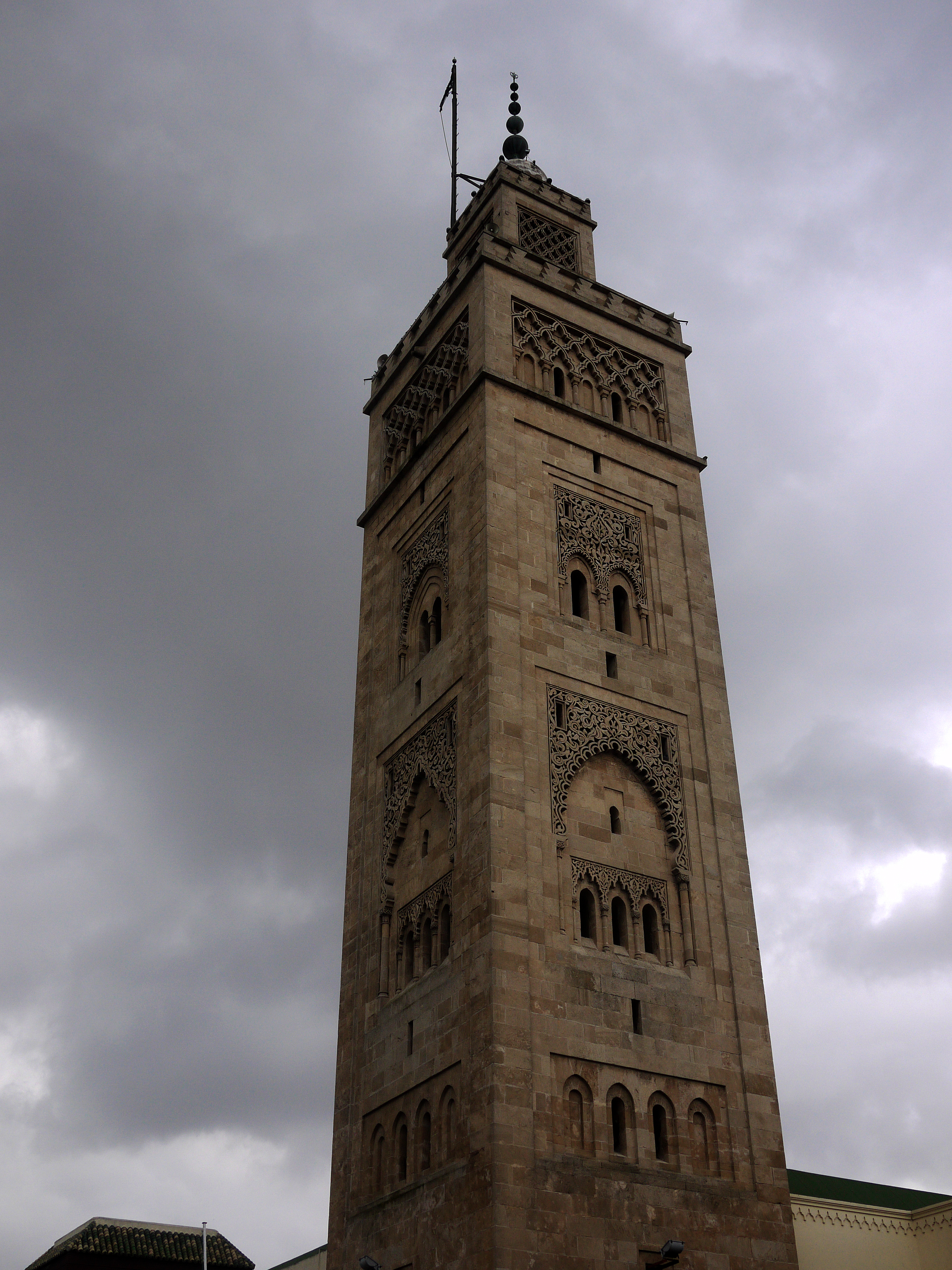
The minaret

Construction on the mosque started on 30 June 1934. Mohammed V, who sponsored the construction, laid its first stone. It was designed by architects Auguste Cadet. Cadet, along with Edmond Brion, was implicated in the design of other buildings in the Habous quarter, including the nearby al-Yusufi Mosque (or Moulay Youssef Mosque). The sultan visited the construction site in August 1934 while work was being supervised by architects Abad and Ben Omar. The mosque was officially inaugurated on 12 June 1936, in the presence of Mohammed V.

The mosque underwent a major restoration in 2007.

== Architecture ==
The building covers an area of around 3,600 m^{2} (39,000 sq ft) and it can accommodate up to 6000 or 8000 worshippers. Its design references traditional Moroccan Islamic architecture; the minaret is modeled on the minaret of the Kutubiyya Mosque in Marrakesh and the courtyard is modeled on the Qarawiyyin Mosque in Fes.

== See also ==
- Islam in Morocco
- List of mosques in Morocco
