= Dar ul-Aala =

Moroccan classical music museum

- دار الآلة
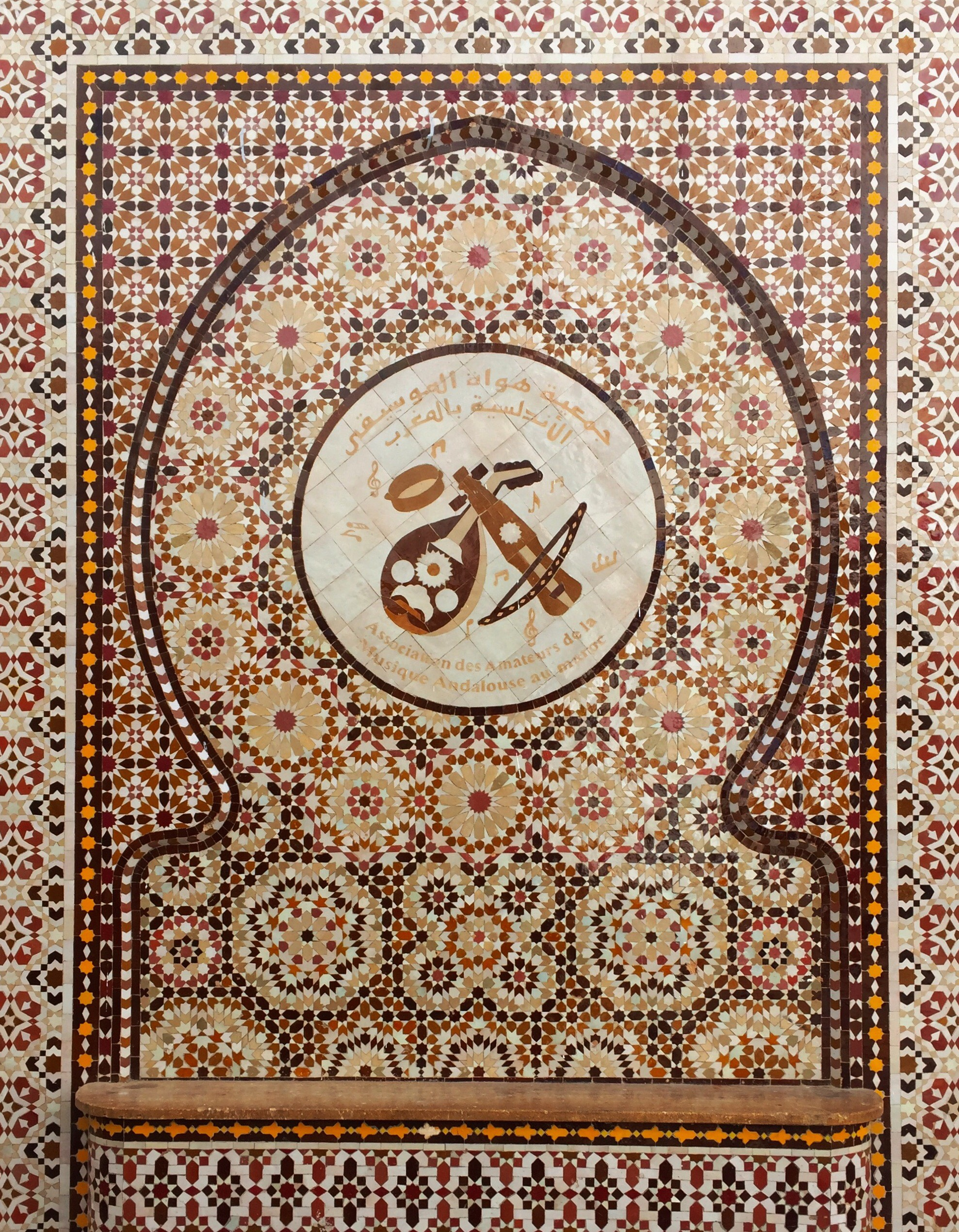
- A sign in front of the museum with ziliij tile work.
- Location: Hubous, Casablanca, Morocco
- Coordinates: 33.578178°N 7.603625°W

Dar ul-Aala (Arabic: دار الآلة, home of the instrument) is a museum dedicated to traditional Mauro-Andalusi music located in Casablanca, Morocco. It was founded in 2010 by the Society of Amateurs of Andalusi Music in Morocco (جمعية هواة الموسيقى الأندلسية بالمغرب). It hosts a collection of valuable antique instruments dating back centuries, as well as rare musical recordings, manuscripts, and publications relating to Andalusi music and its legacy.

== Gallery ==
Some of the historic instruments on display at Dar ul-Aala

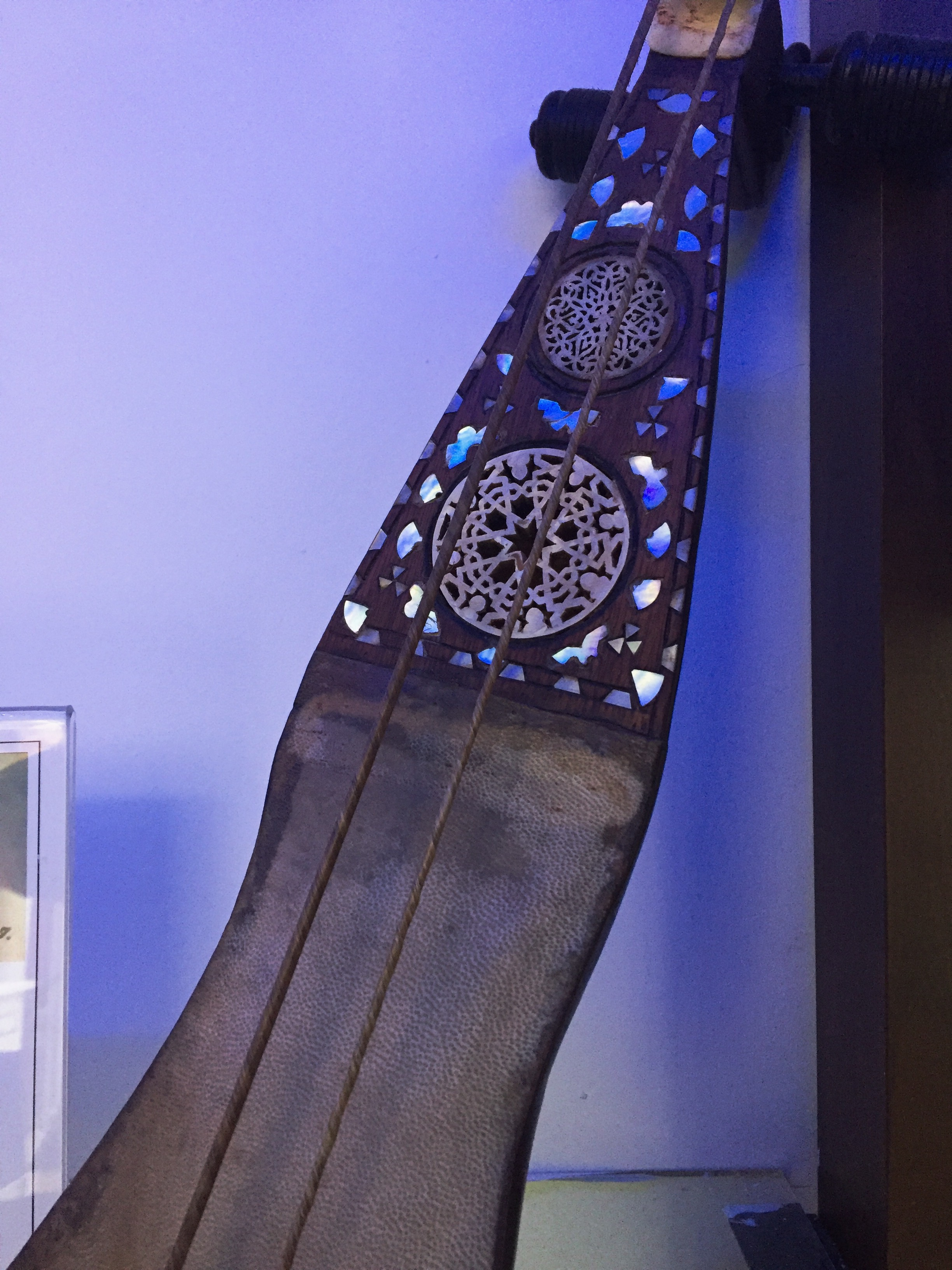
Rebaba

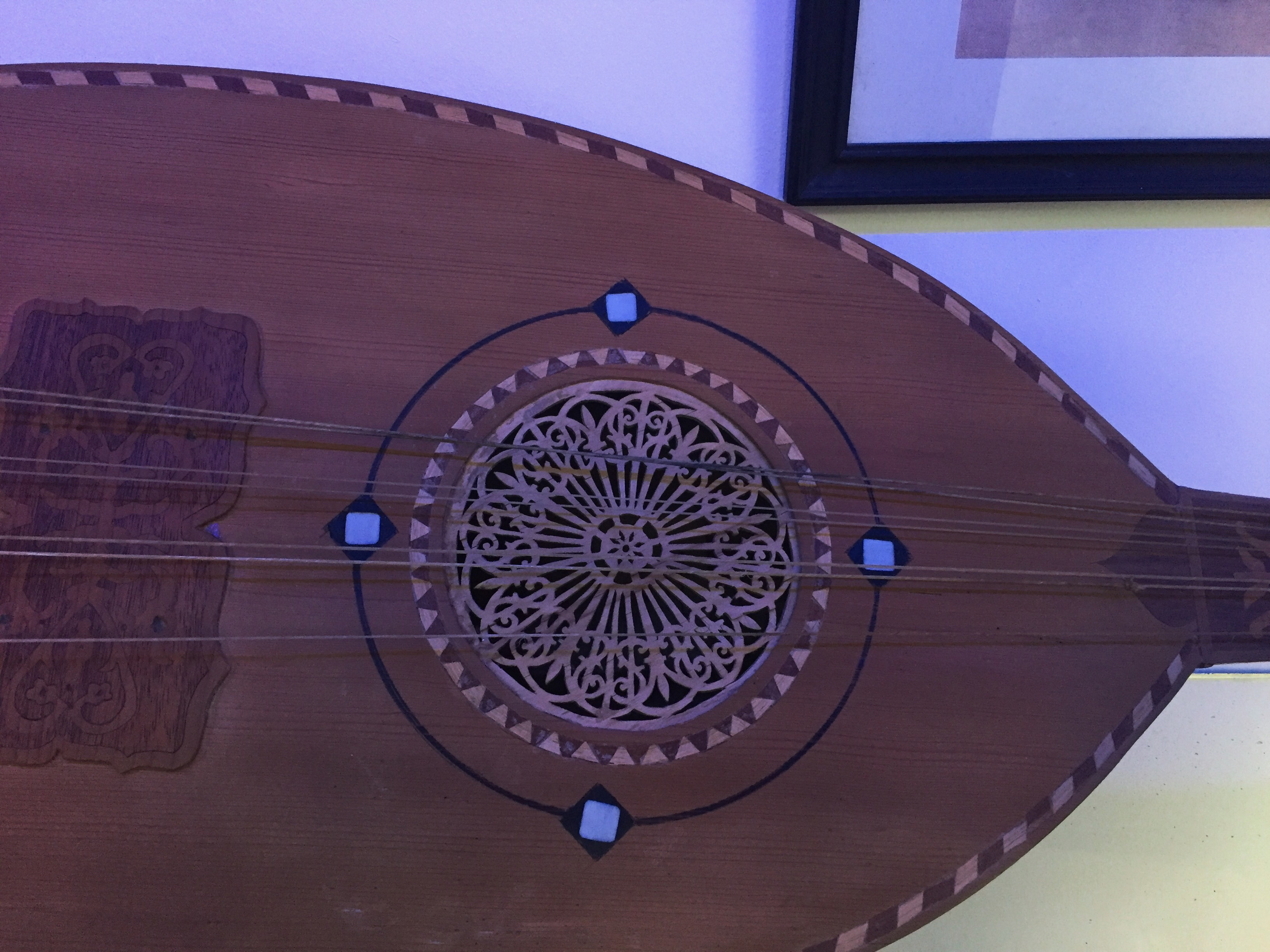
Oud

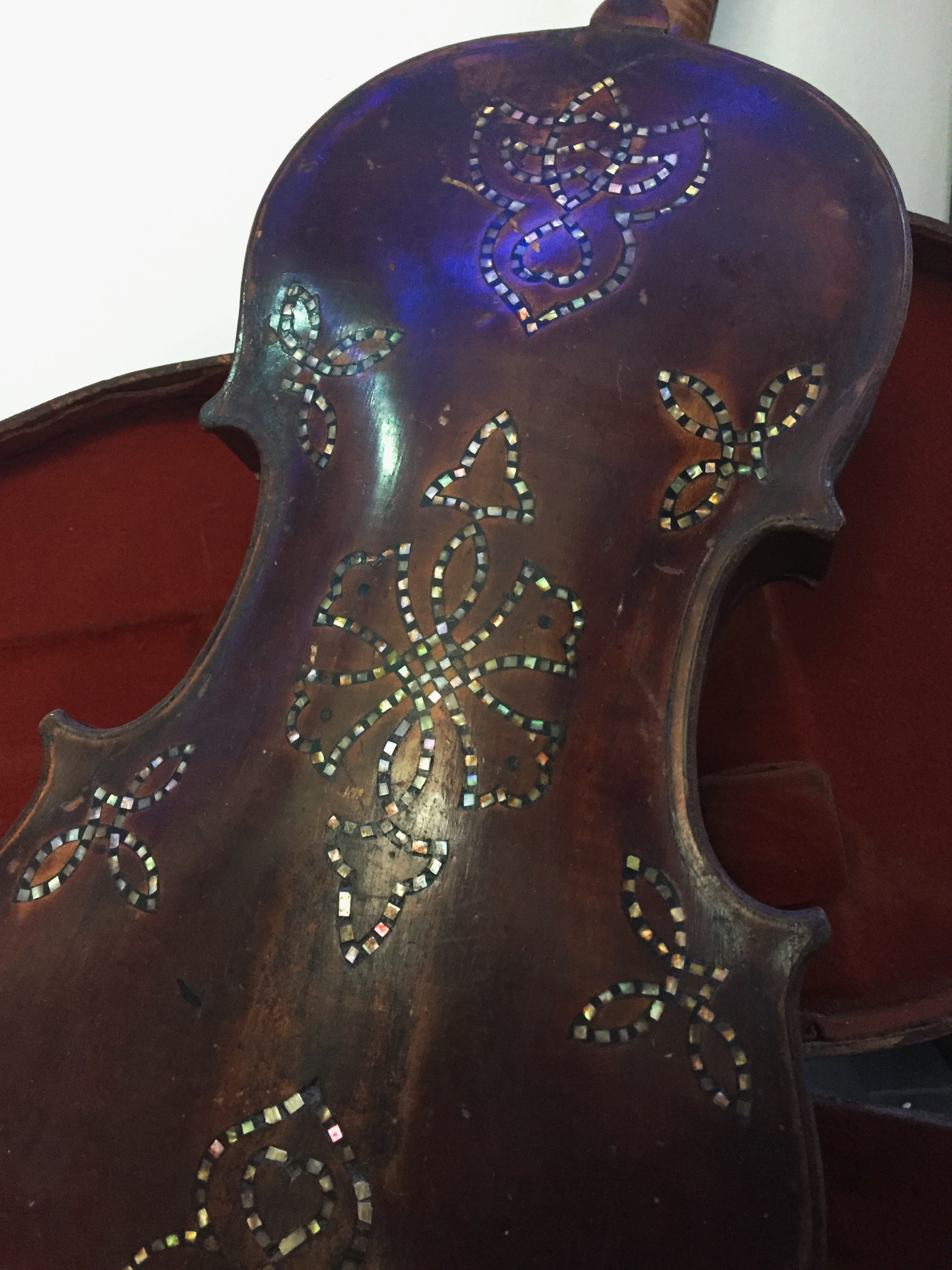
Violin
