= Dar el-Beida, Fez =

Royal residence in Fez, Morocco

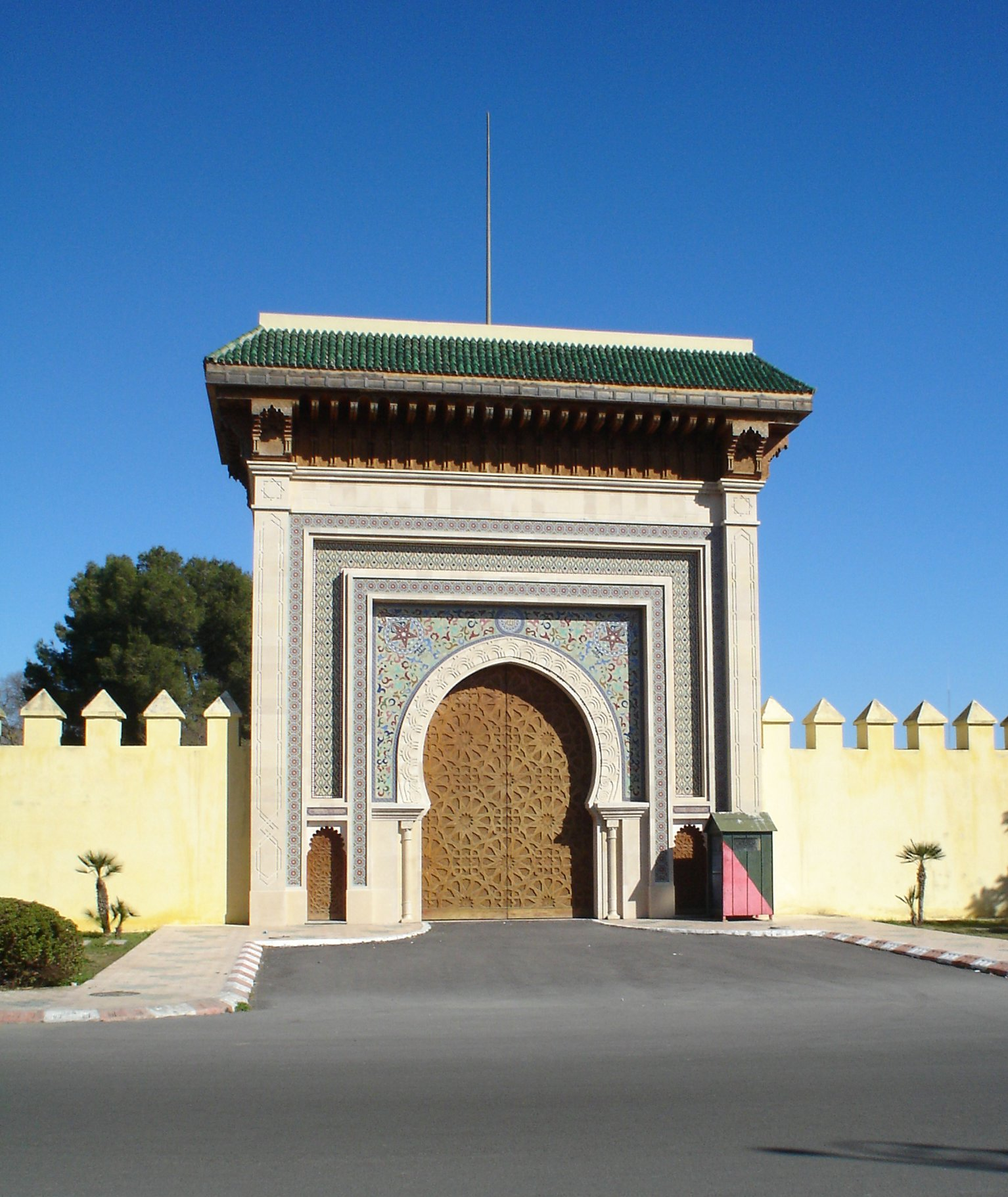
Main entrance of Dar el-Beida

The Dar el-Beida (Arabic: الدار البيضاء, lit. 'White House') is a royal residence in Fez, Morocco. It was originally part of a larger complex that included the nearby Dar Batha to the northeast. In 1915, the two were separated when Dar Batha was converted into a museum. Today, Dar el-Beida remains an active royal residence and is not open to the public.

== History ==
Dar Batha and Dar el-Beida were constructed to serve as a summer palace and as a residence for distinguished visitors and guests. The complex was commissioned and begun in the late 19th century by Sultan Hassan I. Dar Batha was completed under Sultan Abdelaziz, while Dar el-Beida was completed under his rival and successor Abdelhafid.

In 1912 the two palaces were used to house the services of the Resident-general of the new French Protectorate. In 1915, Dar Batha was converted into a museum of local arts, to which the collection previously housed at the Dar Adiyel was transferred. The Dar el-Beida continues to be used by the government as a reception palace.

== Architecture ==
The Dar el-Beida is no longer connected to Dar Batha today. Its grounds, entered via a monumental and ornate gate to the southwest, are filled with large gardens dotted with pavilions, and a main palace in the northeast area with more interior gardens and ornate courtyards. One of the canals derived from the Oued Fes (Fes River) passes through the gardens and the palace.

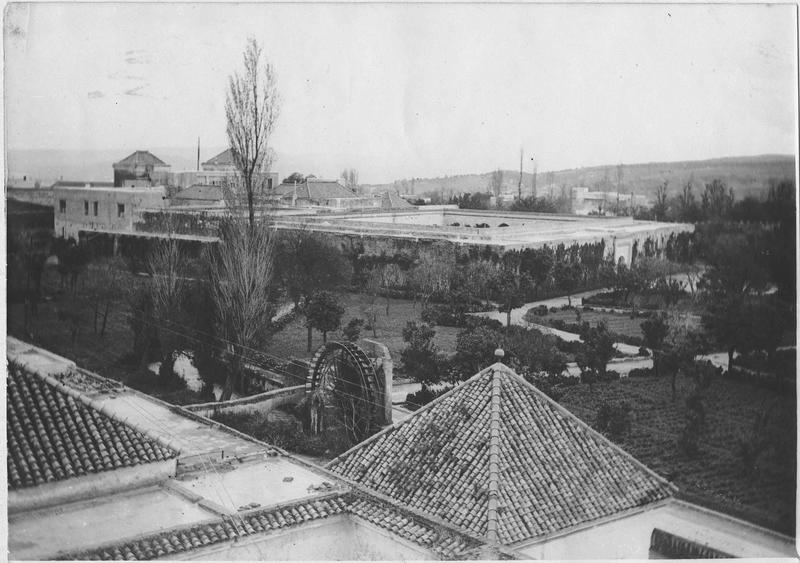
Overview of the Dar el-Beida's palace grounds in 1918

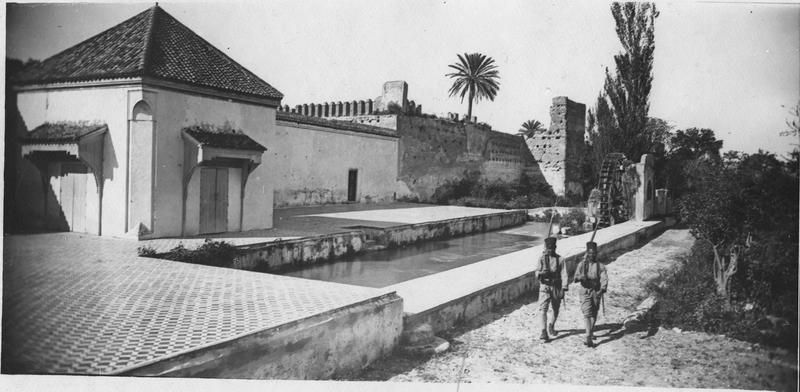
View of the canal (branching off the Oued Fes) passing through the palace gardens (in 1916)

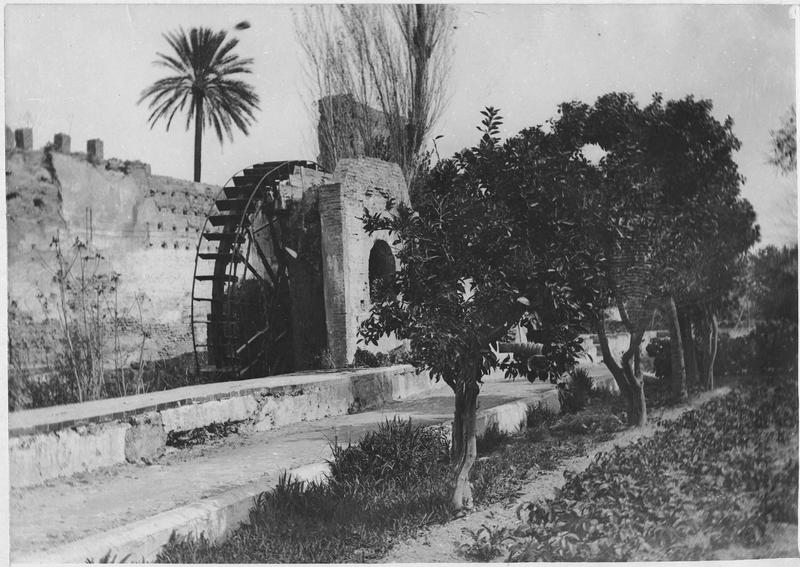
A noria (waterwheel) along the canal in the palace gardens (1916)

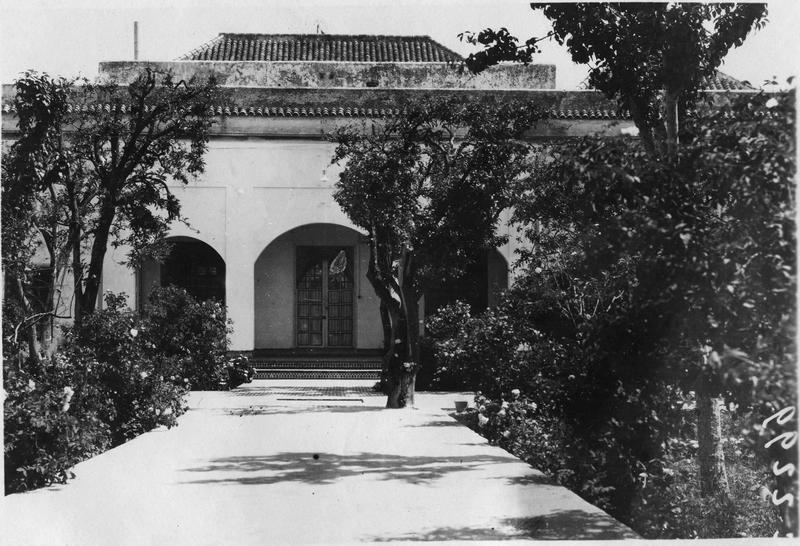
The interior courtyard garden of the main palace (1916)

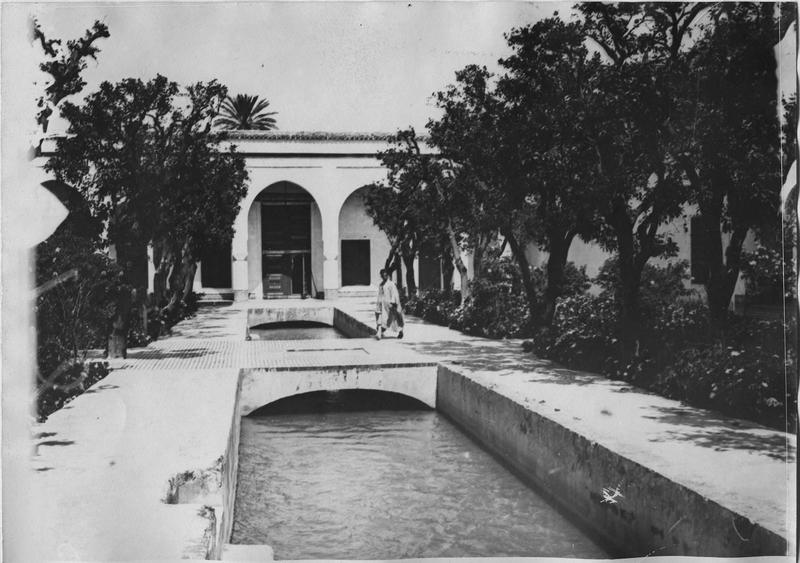
The canal passing through the palace's interior garden (1916)

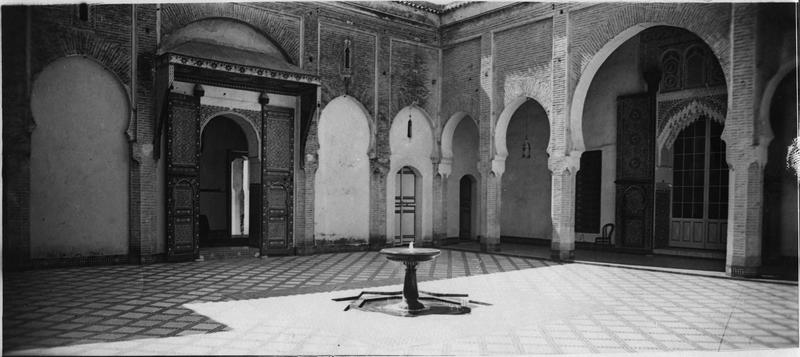
An interior courtyard of the palace, with central fountain (1916)

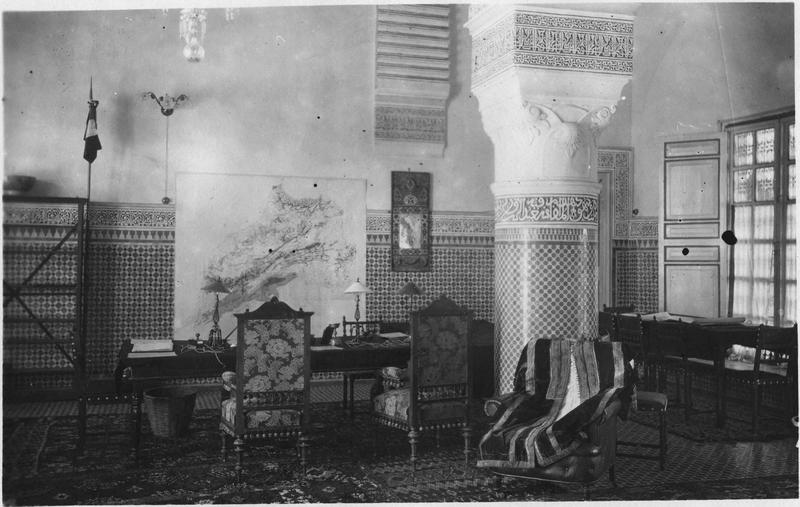
Rooms inside the palace in 1916, when it was the headquarters of the French resident-general

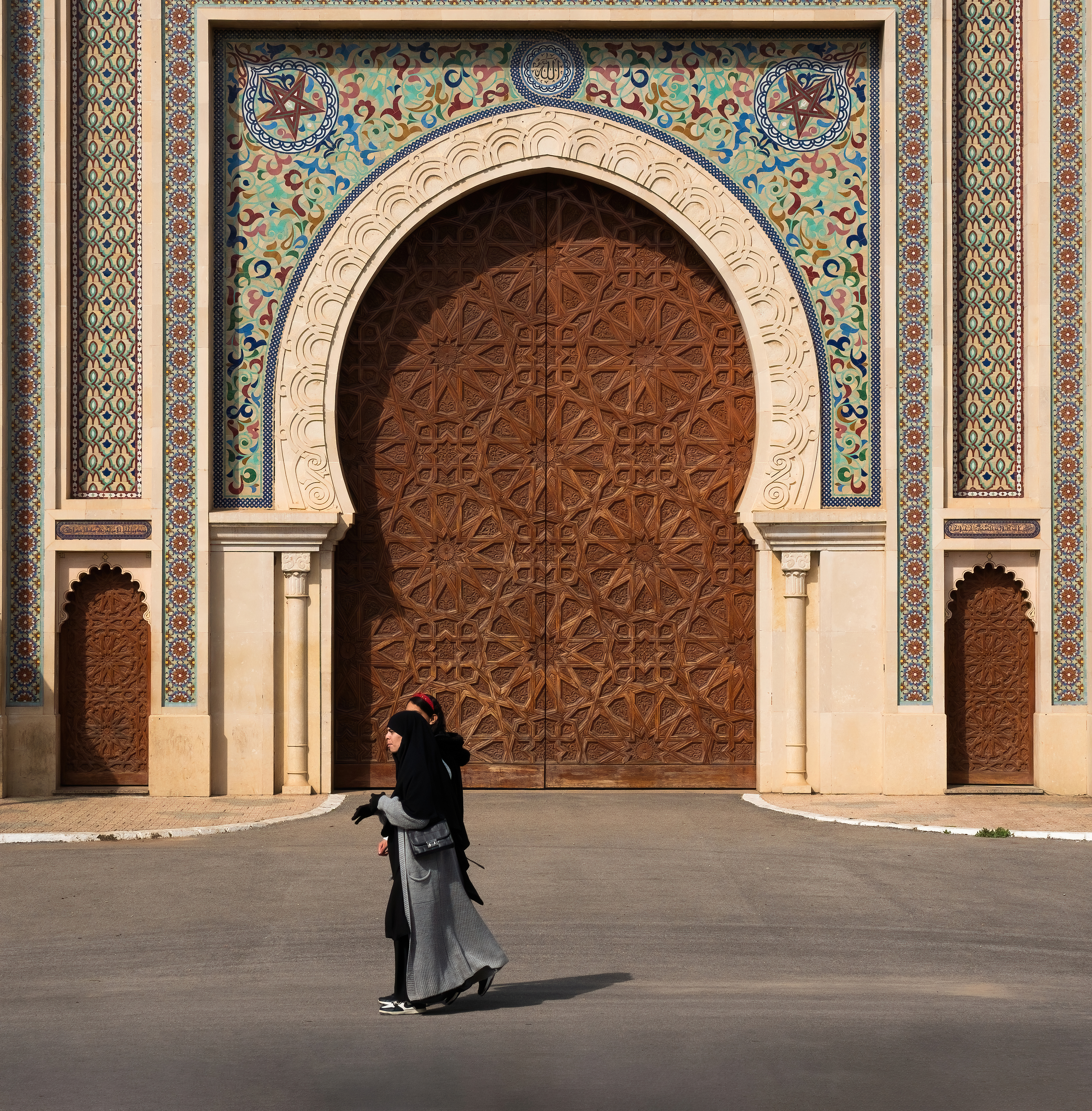
Detail of the main gate in 2024

== See also ==
- Royal Palace of Fez
- List of Moroccan royal residences
