= Mahkamat al-Pasha =

- محكمة الباشا
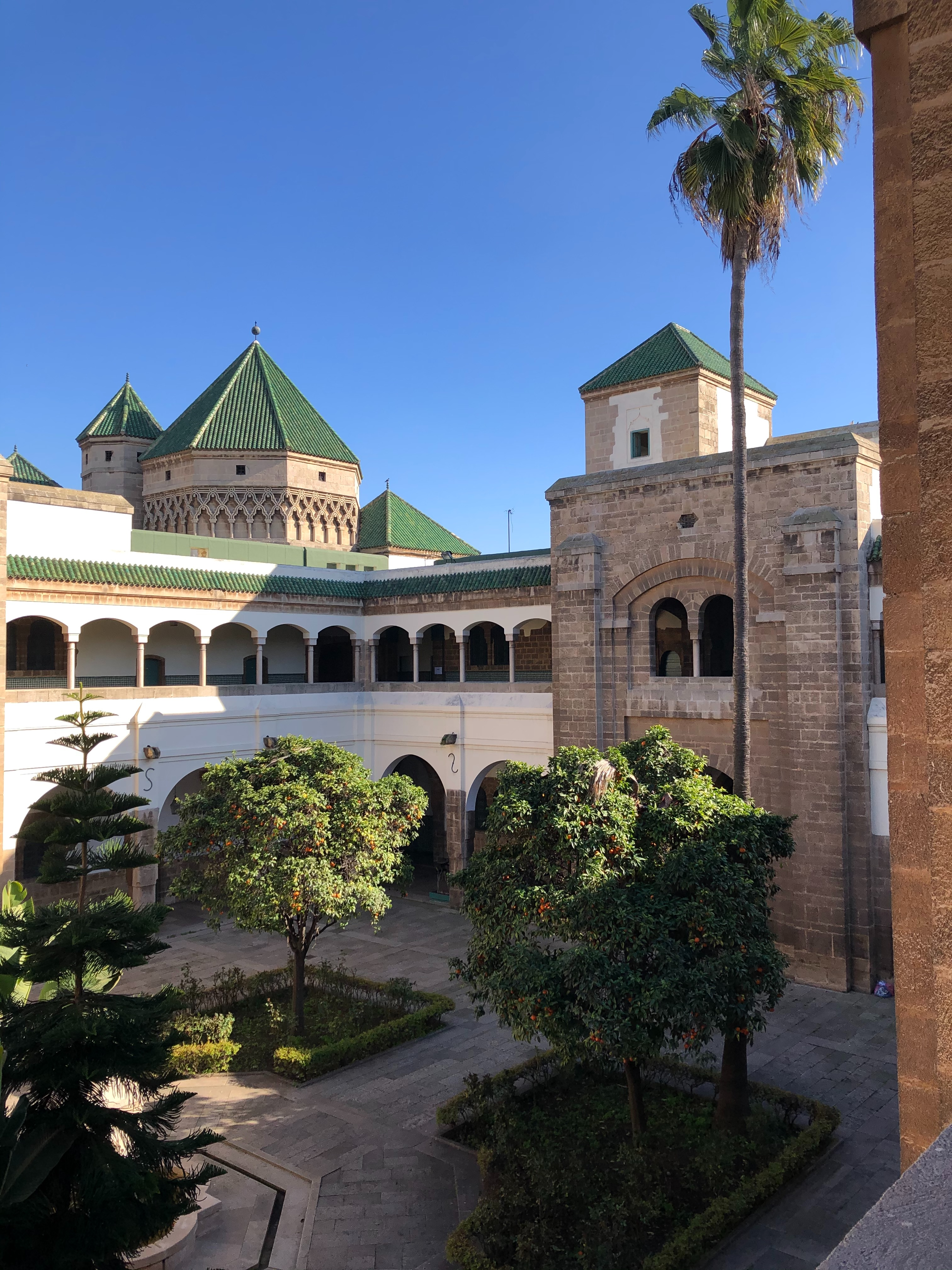
- Interactive map of the Mahkamat al-Pasha area

General information
- Architectural style: Mauro-Andalusi
- Location: Habous, Bd. Victor Hugo, Casablanca, Morocco
- Coordinates: 33.578549°N 7.606574°W
- Construction started: 1941
- Completed: 1942

Technical details
- Material: limestone, marble, Atlas cedar, zeleej, glazed roof tiles, stucco
- Size: 6,000 m^{2} (65,000 sq ft)

Design and construction
- Architect: Auguste Cadet (fr)

Mahkamat al-Pasha (Arabic: مَحْكَمَة الباشا "the pasha's courthouse," French: Mahkama du Pacha) is an administrative building constructed 1941-1942 in the Hubous neighborhood of Casablanca, Morocco. The complex serves or has served as a courthouse, residence of the pasha (governor), parliamentary reception hall, and jail.

== History ==
In January 1930, the pasha of Casablanca at the time At-Tayyib Al-Moqri, the second son of the Moroccan grand vizier Muhammad al-Muqri, decided to build a civil courthouse in the Habous. It was designed by the French architect Auguste Cadet (fr), who was heavily involved in the planning of Casablanca and particularly of its Habous neighborhood.

The construction of the courthouse was carried out during World War II, when French authorities usurped most modern building materials in their colonies, such as steel and cement, for the war effort. As a result, even though the courthouse was built in the mid-twentieth century, it was built with traditional methods, brick by brick. The complex is characterized by traditional Mauro-Andalusi architectural features: zeleej, stucco work, carved cedar wood, and green-tiled roofs.

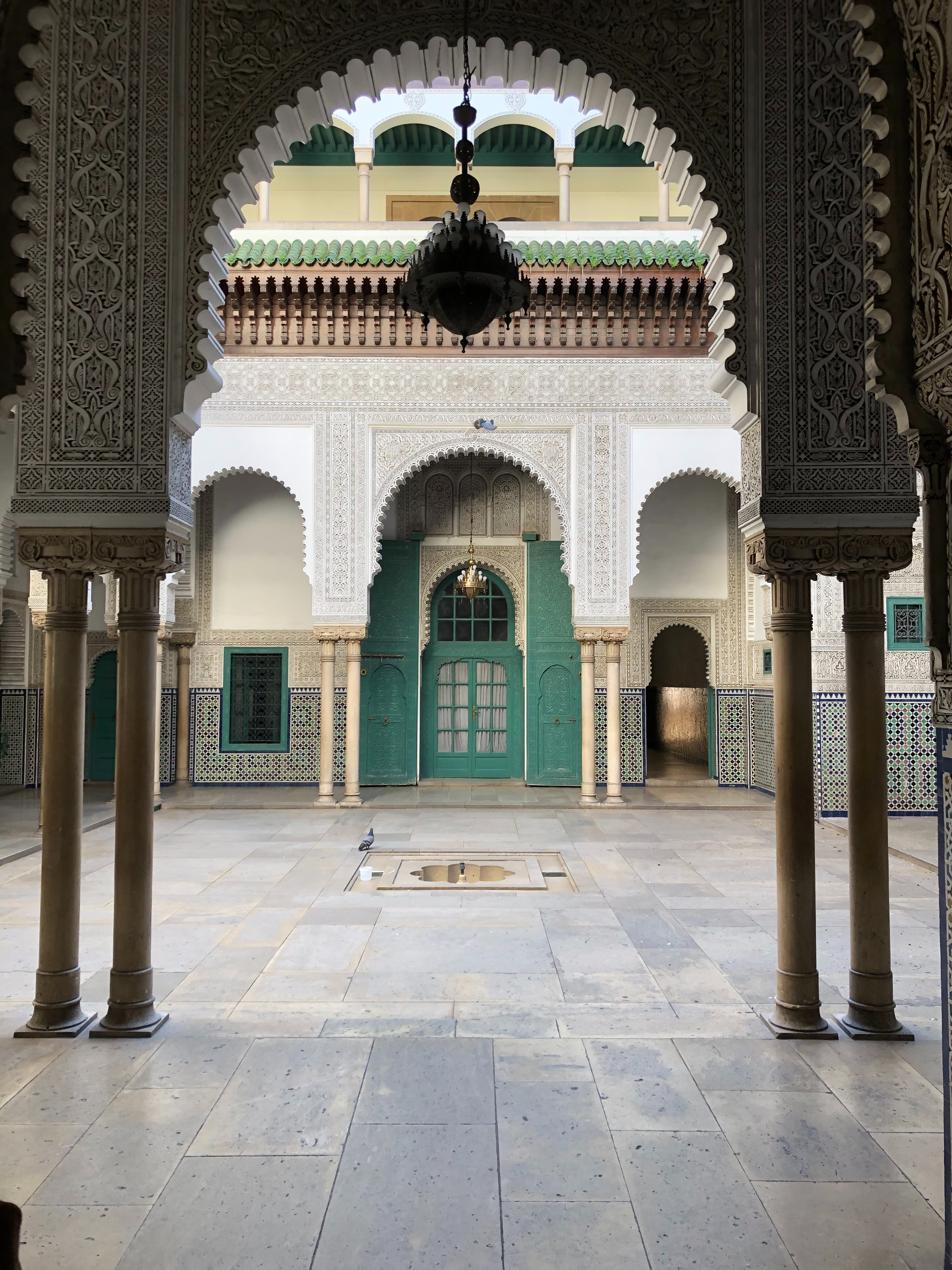
A view of one of the ṣoḥoon framed by an archway.

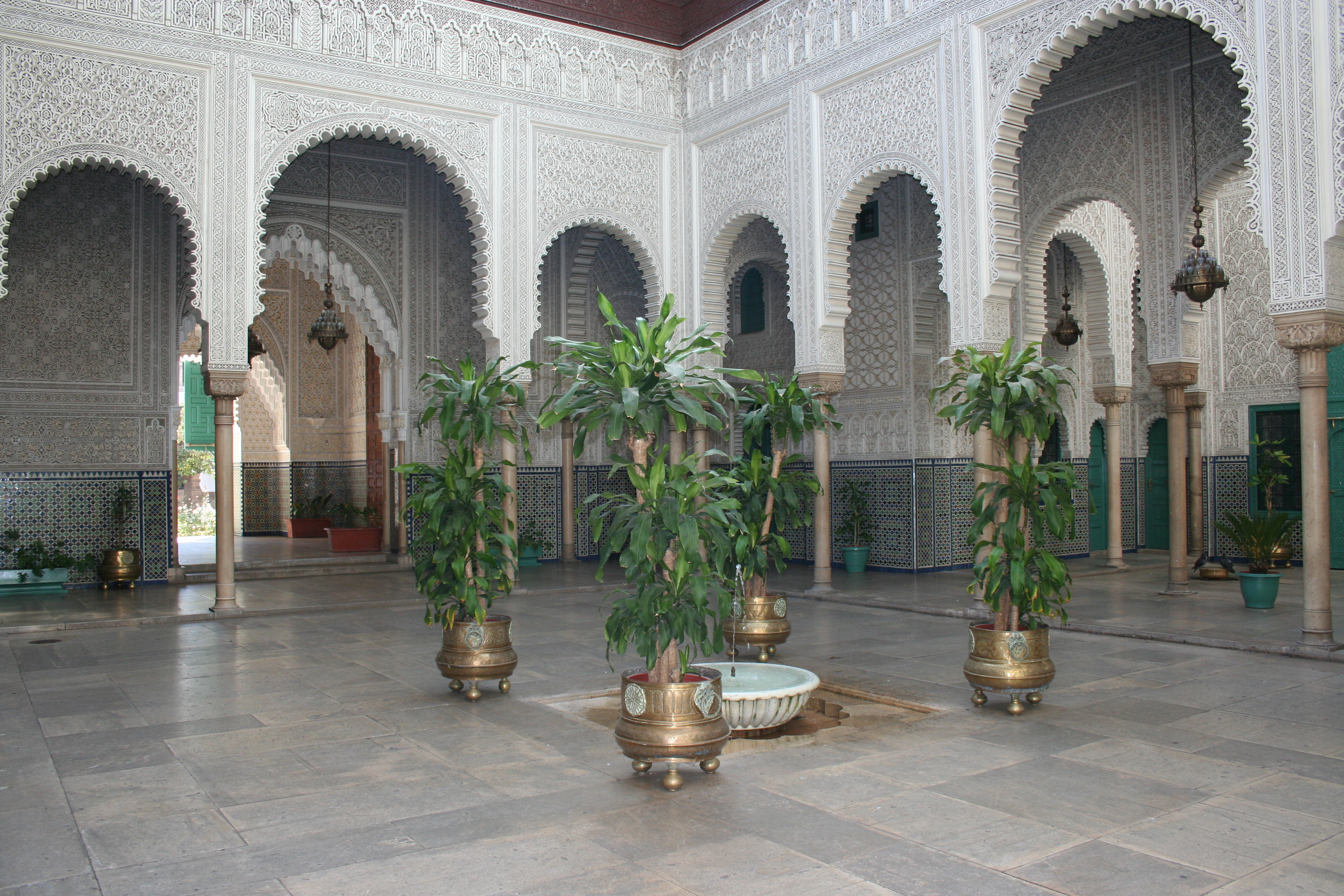
Interior of the building.

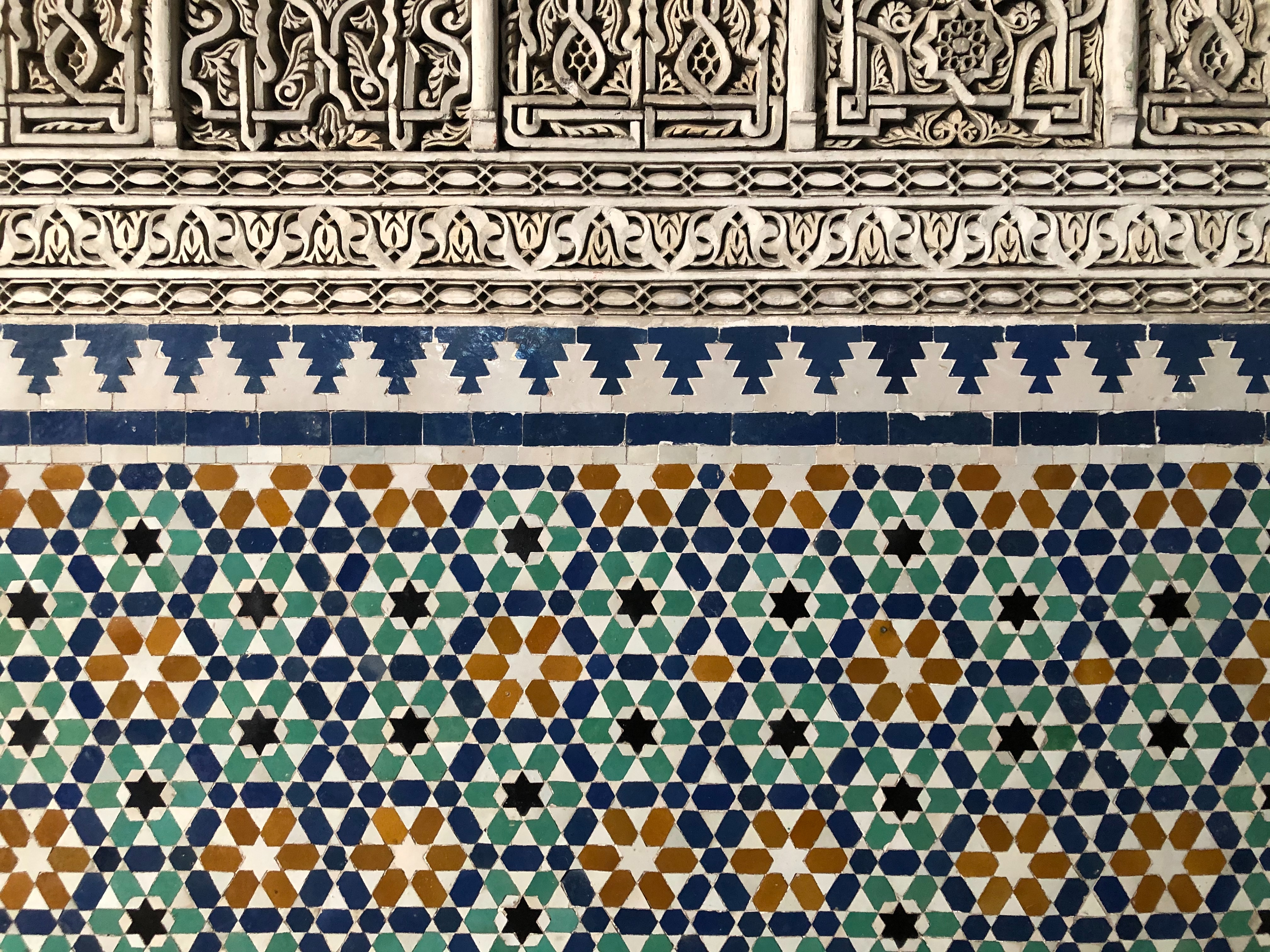
A detail of traditional Moroccan architectural elements: zeliij and arabesque plaster.

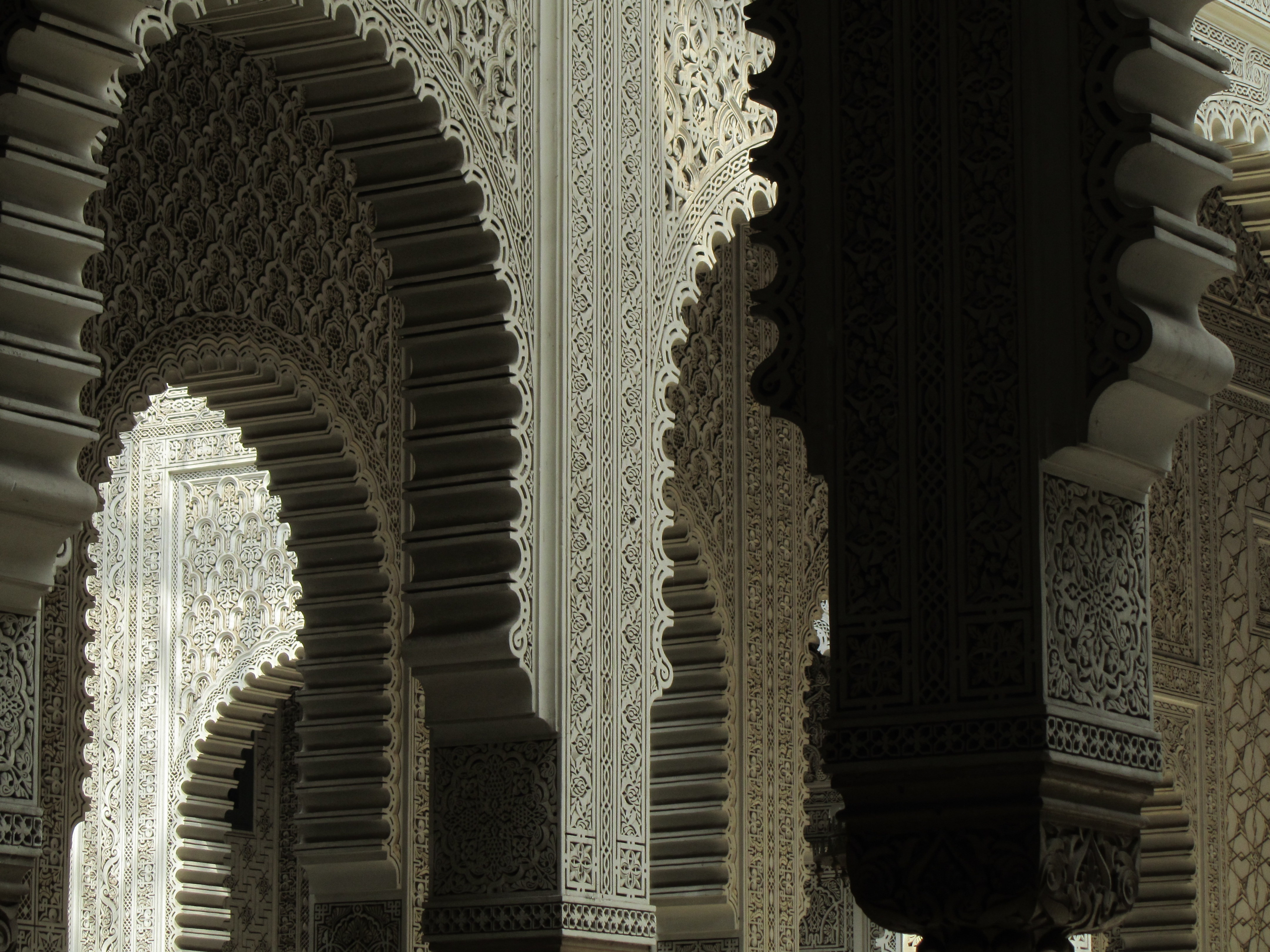
Traditional Moroccan carving.

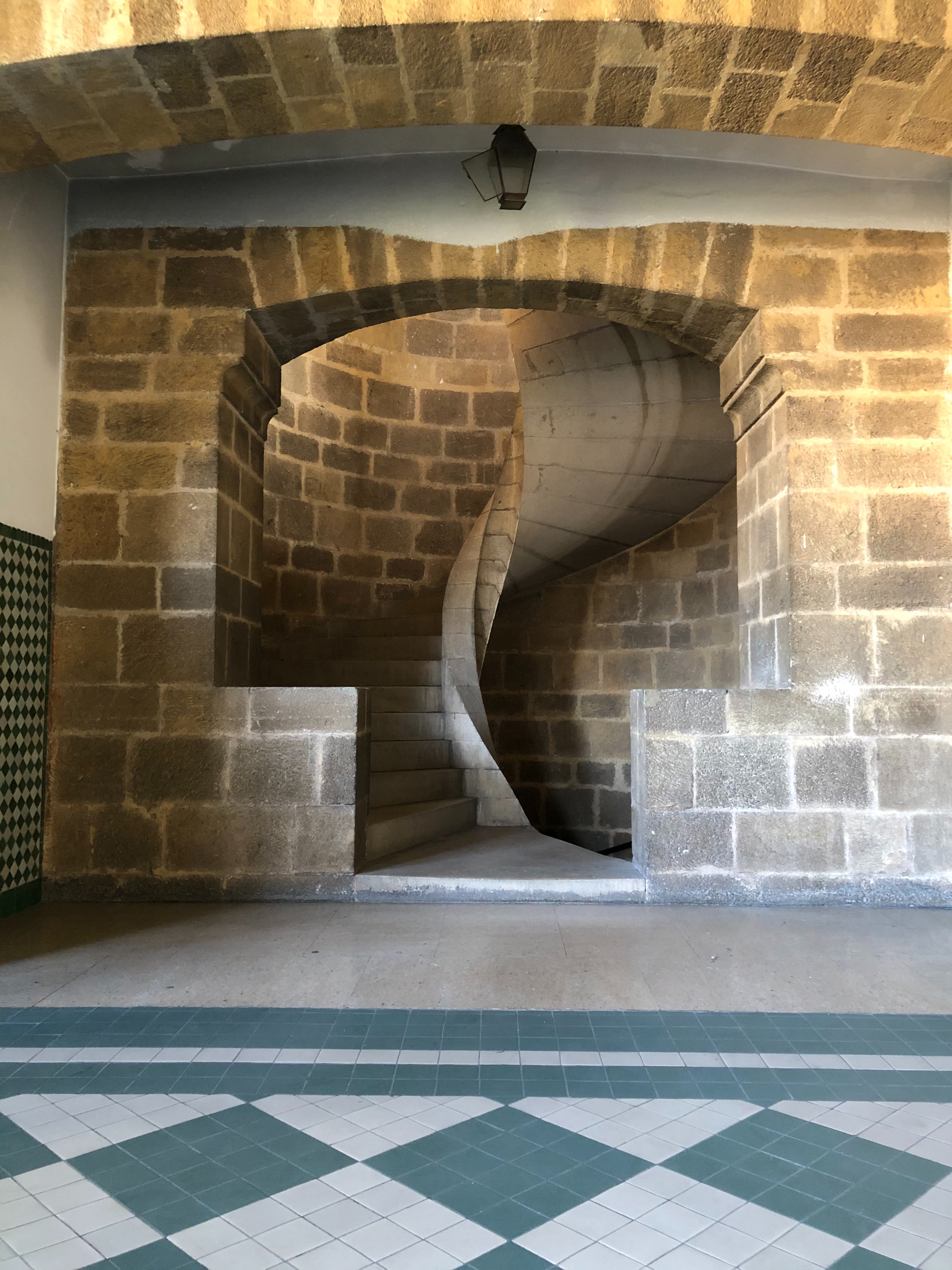
Helix staircase.

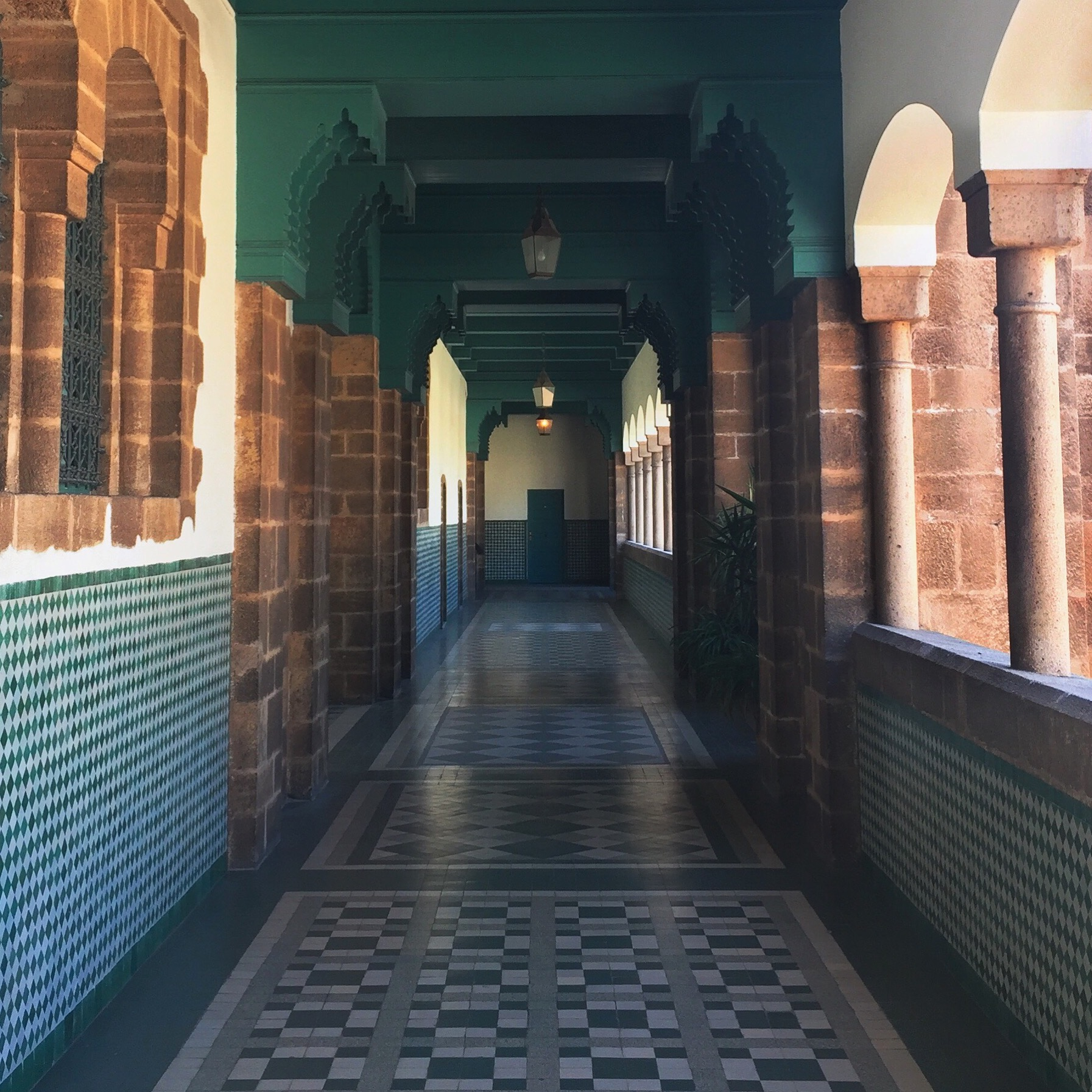
Corridor.

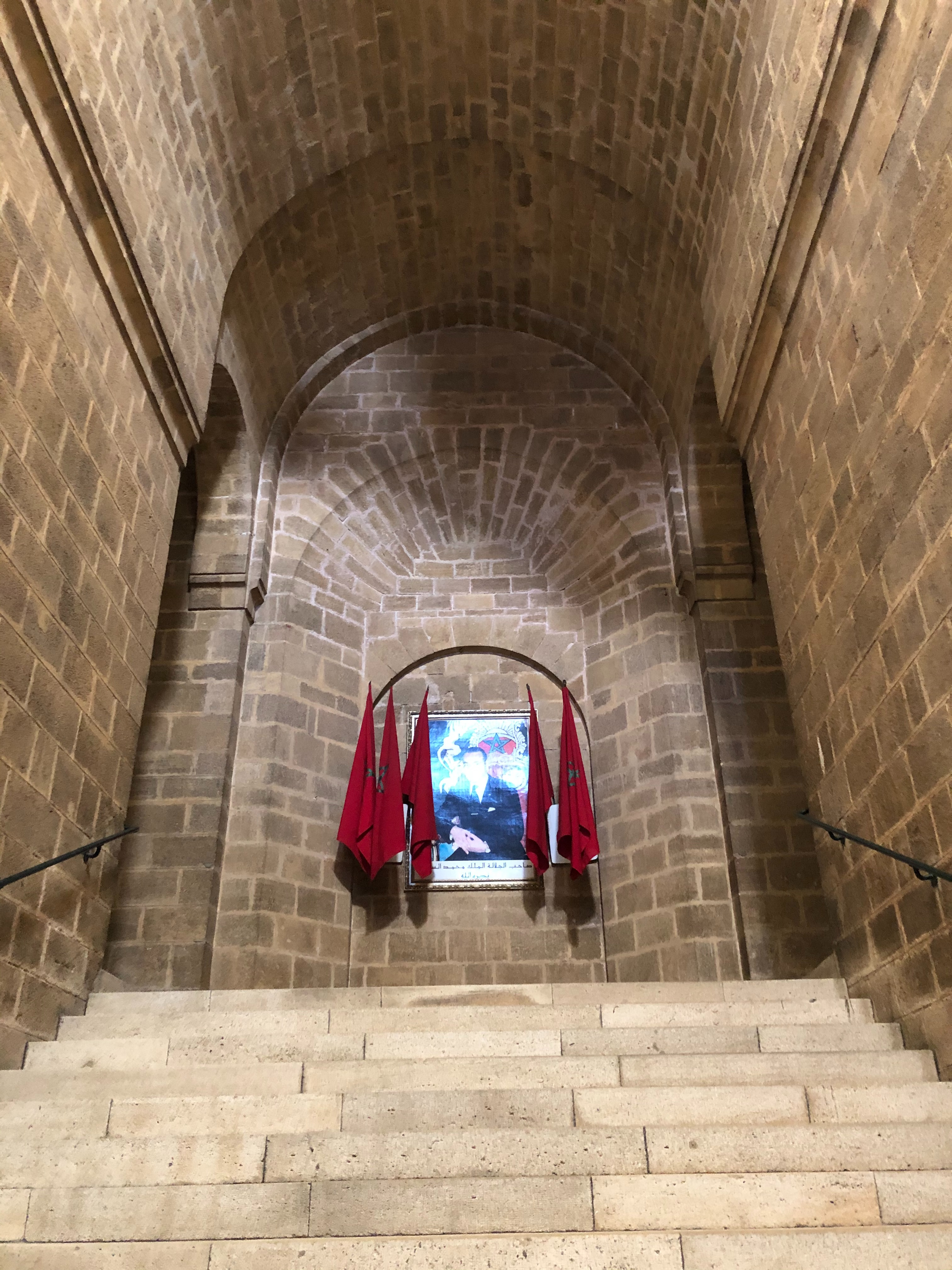
Staircase.

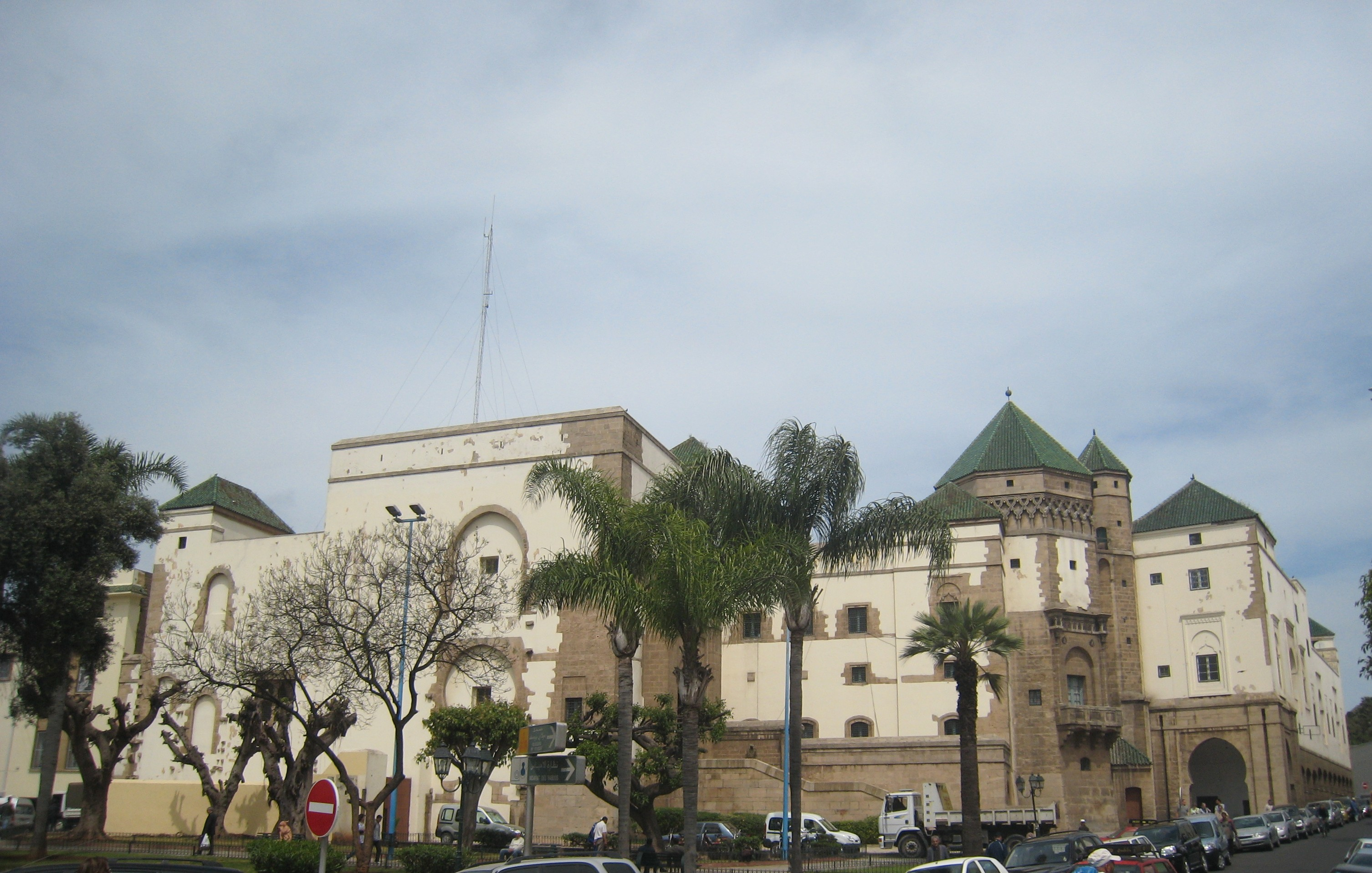
The courthouse from the outside.
