= List of Moroccan royal residences =

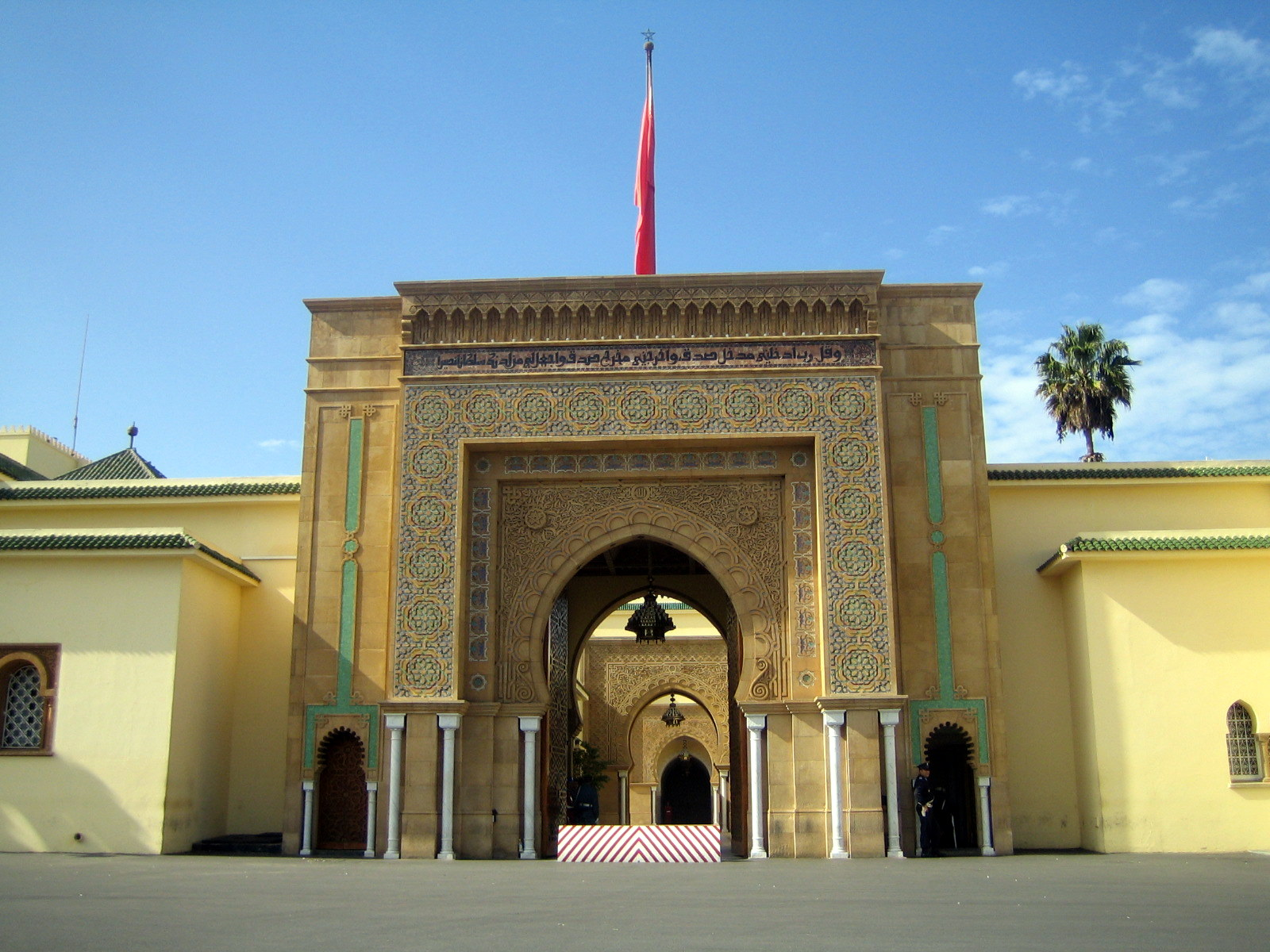
The Royal Palace of Rabat has been the principal official residence of the Moroccan monarchy since 1912

The King of Morocco currently has at least one residence in each of the country's principal cities, sometimes going back to ancient times. They are often referred to as Dar el-Makhzen, lit. 'House of the Makhzen' using the Moroccan term for the monarchical institution.

== Palaces ==
The royal palaces are owned and maintained of the Moroccan state, and made available to the King and his family:

- Royal Palace in part of the Kasbah of Marrakesh, created in 1183 by Caliph Abu Yaqub Yusuf;
- Royal Palace of Fez, created in 1276 by Sultan Abu Yusuf Yaqub ibn Abd al-Haqq;
- Royal Palace of Meknes (also known as Al Mhancha), occupying part of the Kasbah of Moulay Ismail created in 1672 by Sultan Ismail Ibn Sharif;
- Royal Palace of Rabat, created in 1785 by Sultan Mohammed ben Abdallah, principal seat of the monarchy since 1912;
- Dar el-Beida, Fez, created in the late 19th century by Sultan Hassan I;
- Jebel Kebir Palace in the western outskirts of Tangier;
- Royal Palace of Casablanca, erected in the mid-1920s on a design by architects Louis-Paul Pertuzio and Félix-Joseph Pertuzio with garden landscaping by Jean-Claude Nicolas Forestier
- Dar Es Salam Palace, Rabat, created by Sultan Mohammed V;
- Royal Palace of Ifrane, created by Sultan Mohammed V in the 1930s;
- Royal Palace of Tétouan, created in 1956 by merging the former governor's mansion with the adjacent residence-general of the Spanish protectorate in Morocco in Tétouan. The oldest building in the compound, Dar al-Emrat, dates to 1740.
- Summer Palace of Skhirat, created by King Hassan II, the scene of the 1971 Moroccan coup d'état attempt;
- Royal Palace of Agadir, created by Hassan II in the 1990s and including an ocean-facing golf course;
- Marshan Palace, Tangier, former seat of the International Legislative Assembly of the Tangier International Zone, repurposed in the 2010.

== Private residences ==
Other royal residences, unlike the above-listed palaces, are privately owned by the royal family:

- The "Royal Farm" (Mazraâ Malakia) of Bouznika was created by Hassan II, who often resided there in his later years;
- As of the early 2020s, the king was reported to often stay at his residences in Salé near Rabat, Anfa and Tamaris near Casablanca, and Al Hoceima and M'diq on the Mediterranean coast;
- Other residences are at the Douiyet farm near Fez and in Midelt, Nador, Oujda, and Safi;
- A former residence of Mohammed V in Oualidia is now in a state of disrepair.

== Former properties ==
In pre-Protectorate Morocco, the governor's mansion in places other than the Imperial cities could also be known as Dar El-Makhzen as they were symbols of the monarchy, and the monarch would typically stay there on occasional visits. For example, the Kasbah Palace in Tangier is still often referred to as Dar El-Makhzen even though it was never a permanent residence of the sultan or king.

The ruins of the 16th-century El Badi Palace in the Kasbah of Marrakesh are open to the public. The late-19th-century Dar Batha palace in Fez, adjacent to Dar el-Beida and originally part of the same complex, was repurposed as a museum in 1915. Dar Soltane (lit. 'the Sultan's palace') in Safi was converted into administrative offices under the protectorate and has hosted Morocco's National Ceramics Museum since 1990. Another former property also known as Dar Es-Sultan in Essaouira is now in ruined condition.

The Abdelhafid Palace in Tangier is a rare case of a former ruling family property that has passed into foreign hands. It was built but never used by former Sultan Abdelhafid following his abdication in 1912. It was seized by the protectorate authorities in 1918 and purchased by Italy in 1927, and is therefore also known as the Palace of Italian Institutions.

== Properties outside Morocco ==
The Moroccan state and royal family also own properties abroad. For example in Paris, they have been reported as owners of the historic Hôtel de Broglie at 73, rue de Varenne, described as the largest privately owned property in Paris, as well as urban mansions at 44, rue Fabert and 20, avenue Emile-Deschanel, both in the prestigious 7th arrondissement. In 2025, the monarchy was reported as selling the Château d'Armainvilliers north of Paris, which it had purchased in the 1980s. Another country estate, further north at Betz, Oise, has been a Moroccan royal residence since 1972.

== See also ==
- Lists of royal residences
- French Protectorate Residence, Rabat
