= Royal Palace of Casablanca =

Residence of the King of Morocco

Coordinates: 33.5804°N 7.6055°W

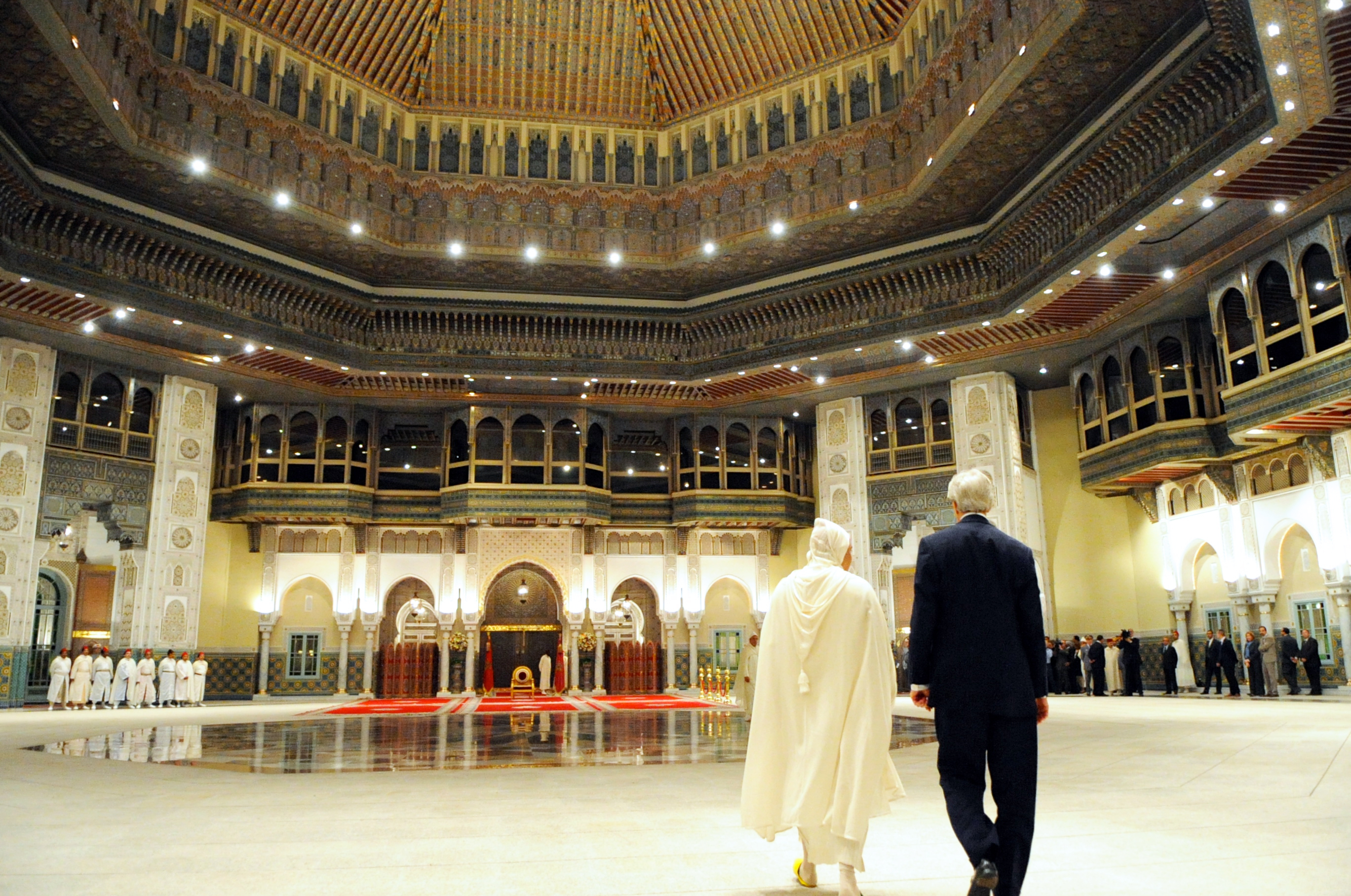
Ceremonial room inside the palace, photographed in 2014 during a visit by U.S. Secretary of State John Kerry

The Royal Palace of Casablanca (Arabic: القصر الملكي بالدار البيضاء, romanized: Al-Qaṣr al-Malakī bi-al-Dār al-Bayḍāʼ) is the main royal residence of the King of Morocco in Casablanca, Morocco. Located in the Hubous neighborhood, it was built in the 1920s on a design by the brothers Louis-Paul and Félix-Joseph Pertuzio, with garden landscaping by Jean-Claude Nicolas Forestier. It was refurbished under King Hassan II by designer André Paccard.

Considered the second most prominent royal site in Morocco after the Royal Palace of Rabat, it has been the venue of significant events. These include the fourth summit of the Organisation of Islamic Cooperation in 1984, and Hassan II's meeting with Pope John Paul II in 1985, the first time a pope visited a Muslim country at the invitation of an Islamic leader. The Royal Palace is not open to the public.

== See also ==
- List of Moroccan royal residences
