= Edmond Brion =

French architect

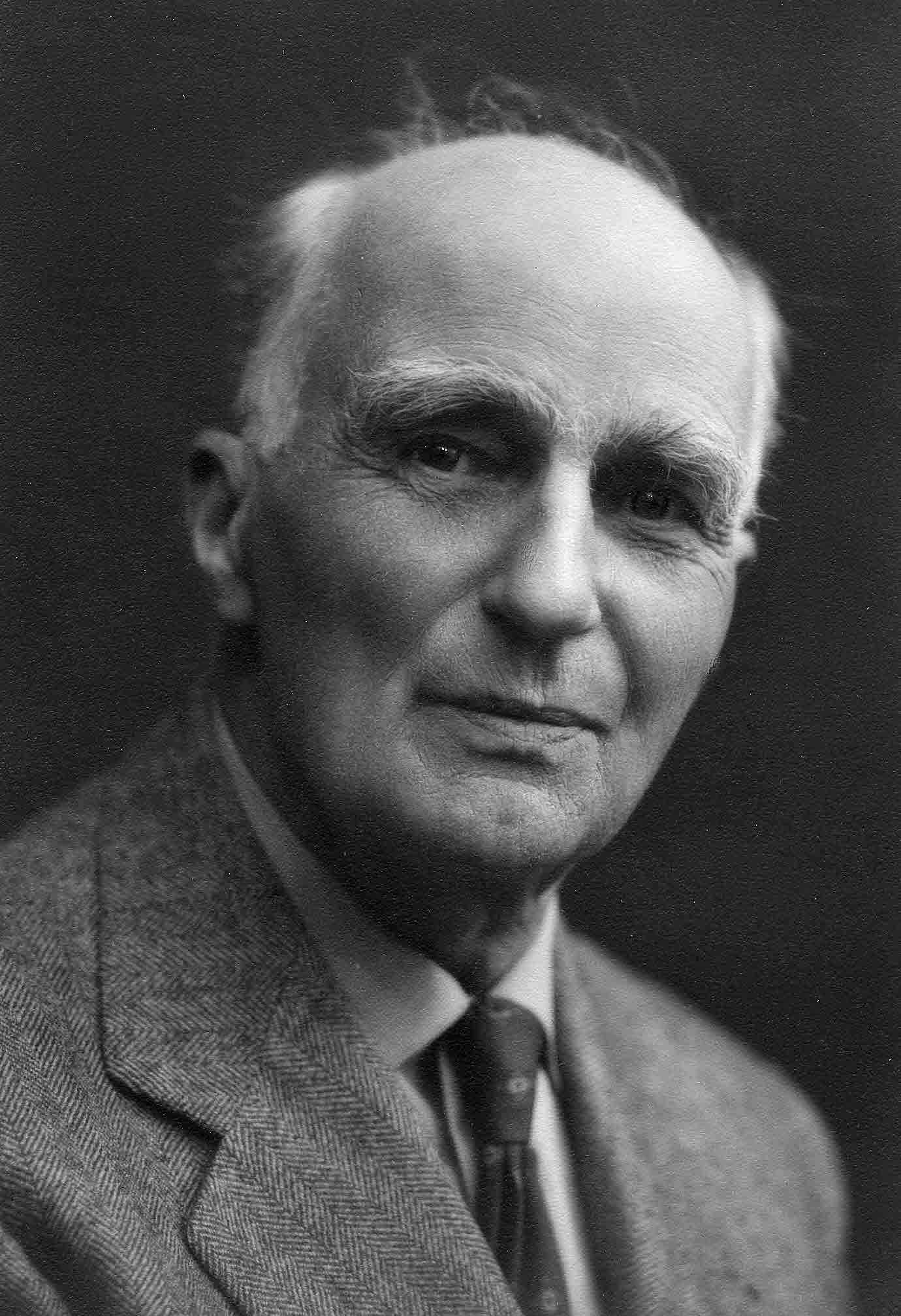
- Occupation: Architect
- Practice: Associated architectural firm[s]

Edmond Brion (1885 Soissons - 1973) was a French architect active in Casablanca during the French Protectorate.

== Biography ==
After World War I and after having studying at the École des Beaux-Arts in Paris in the Paulin studio, Brion settled in Casablanca and worked with Auguste Cadet through the mid 1930s. While working with Cadet, Brion contributed to the project of the nouvelle ville indigène, now known as the Hubous, and designed the Tasso Building (1931) as well as that of the Société commerciale des grains.

His two major works are the Bendahan Building (1935) located at November 16 Square in Derb Omar, and Casablanca's branch of the State Bank of Morocco (1937), featuring a large hall of marble, Art Deco metalwork, and exceptional reinterpreted zeliij. He also designed the cité ouvrière indigène (1939) for the Compagnie Sucriere Marocaine (COSUMA) and the colonial brothel quarter known as Bousbir.

Bank al-Maghrib in Casablanca

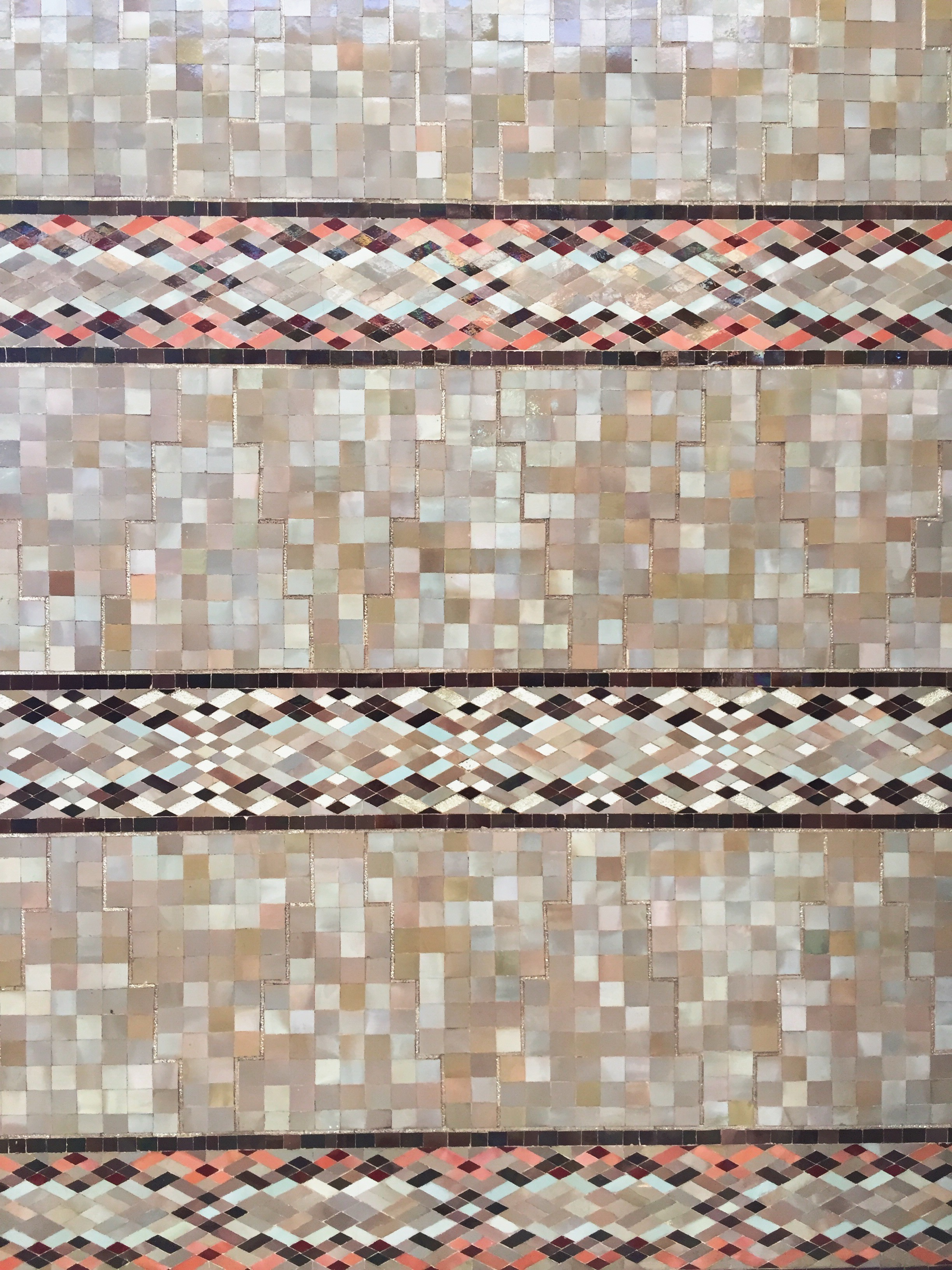
Reinterpreted zellige.

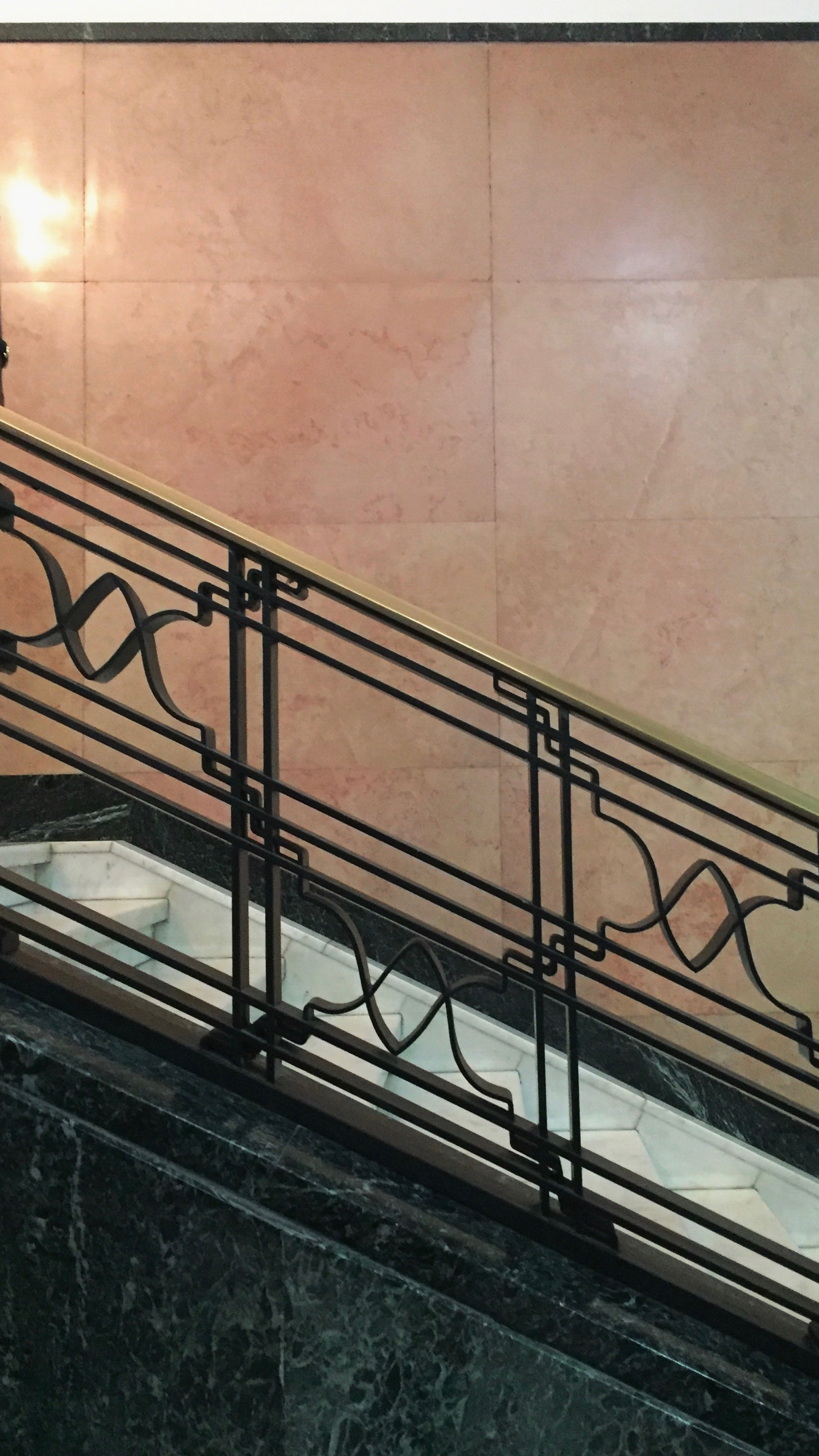
Stairs

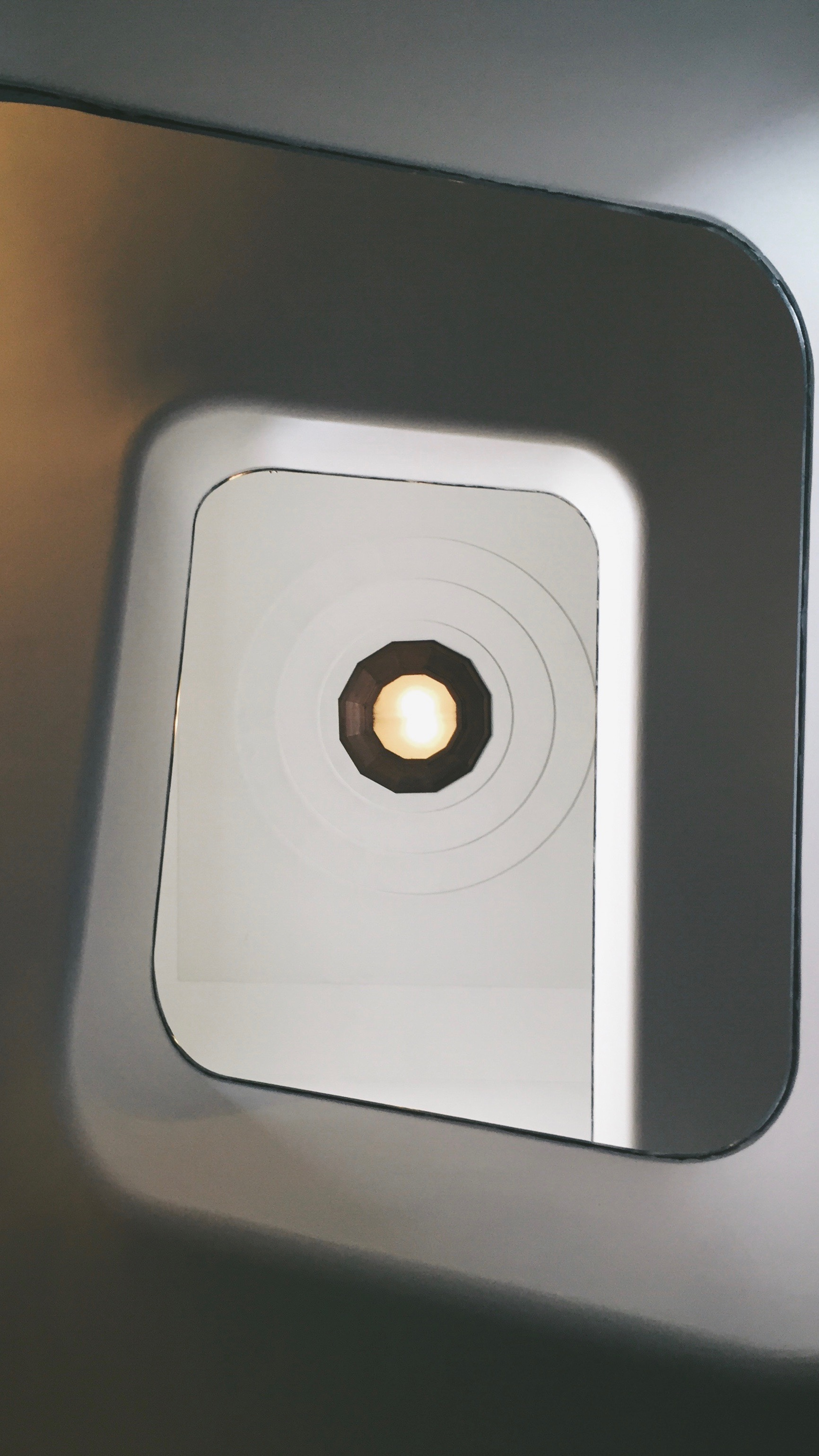
Staircase.

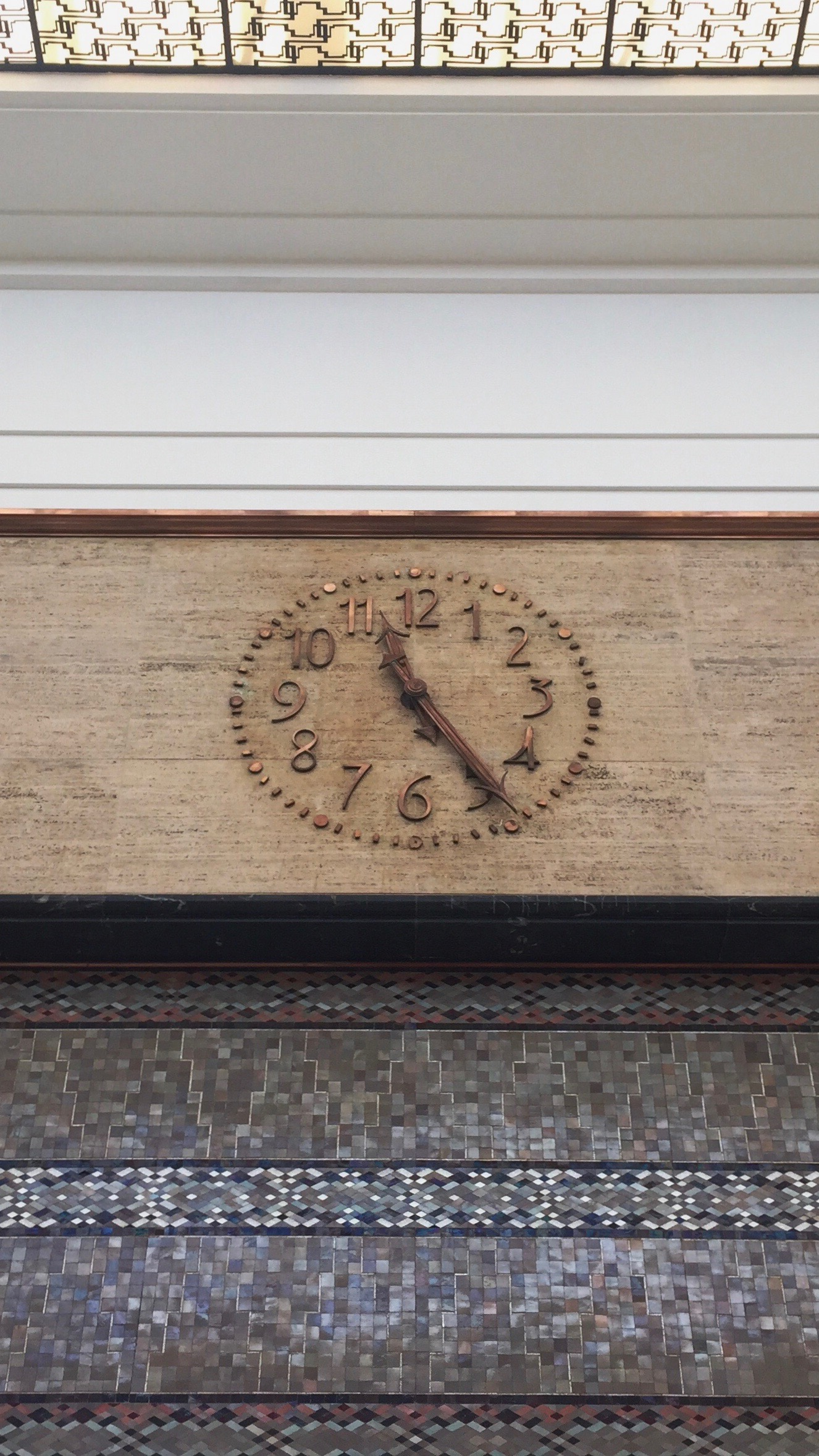
Clock.

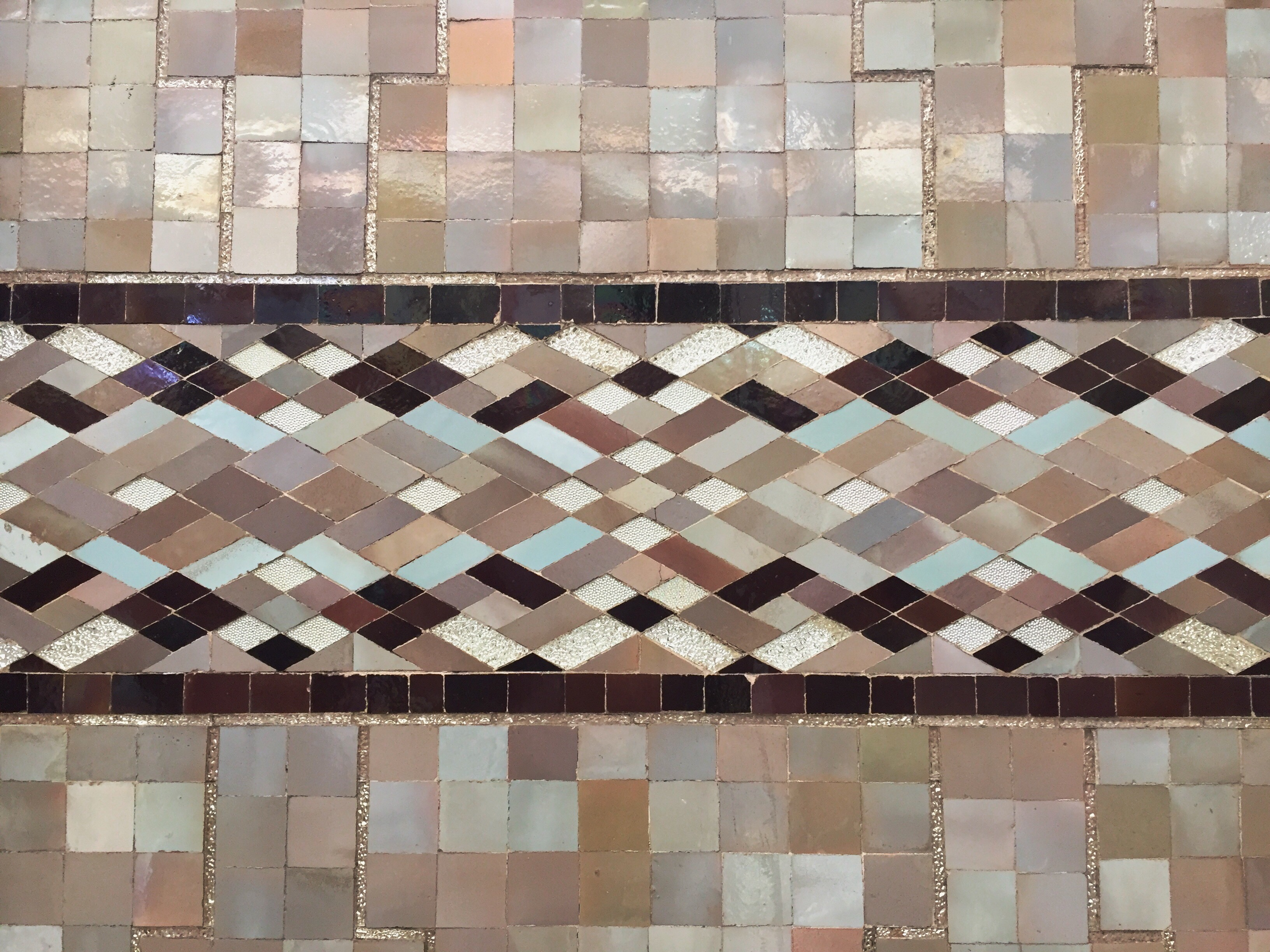
Reinterpreted zellige close-up.

In 1930, he founded the Moroccan chapter of SADG (Société des architectes diplômés par le gouvernement).
