= Hubous =

Neighborhood of Casablanca, Morocco

Coordinates: 33.5774°N 7.6064°W

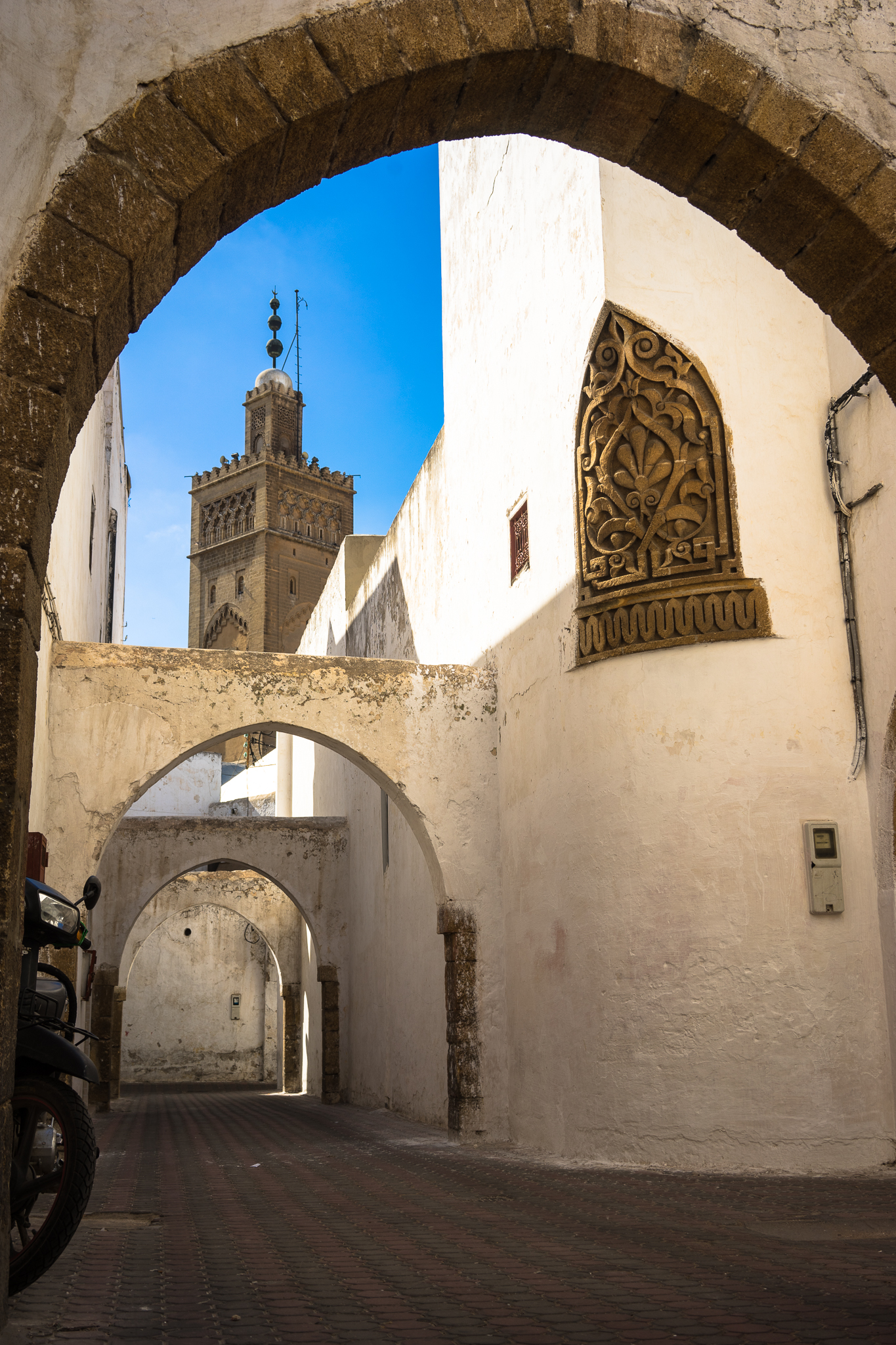
- A typical view from within the alleys of the Hubous neighborhood in Casablanca
- Interactive map of Hubous

The Hubous (Arabic: الحُبوس al-Hubous or حَي الأَحْباس Hay al-Aḥbās), or colloquially Habous, is one of the older neighborhoods of Casablanca, Morocco. Its development dates back to 1916, in the early stages of the French protectorate. The neighborhood is a cultural and religious center for Casablanca and for Morocco, as it hosts the Moroccan Ministry of Islamic Affairs as well as bookstores of important Moroccan and Arabic publishing houses. The many traditional and historic buildings also make the Hubous a popular tourist destination.

== Name ==
The words ḥubous (حُبوس) and aḥbās (أَحْباس) are plurals of the word ḥabs (حَبْس), also called a waqf (وَقْف): an inalienable charitable real estate endowment for Islamic religious purposes or charity. The Moroccan Ministry of Hubous and Islamic Affairs is located in the neighborhood.

== History ==
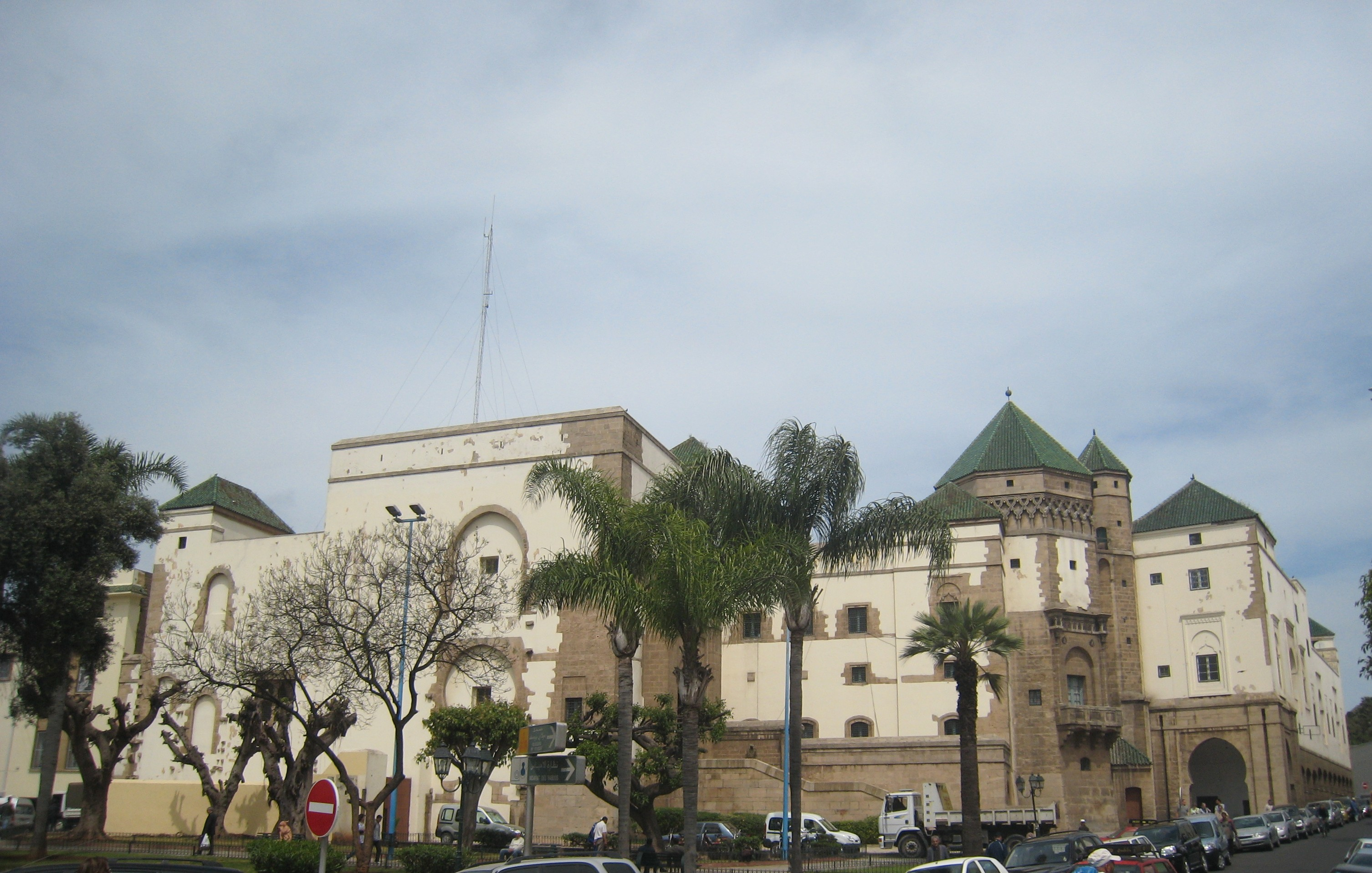
Looking toward Mahkamat al-Pasha.

In 1916, almost a decade after the French invasion and occupation of Casablanca and four years after the official establishment of the French protectorate, General Lyautey's handpicked urban planner Henri Prost and his team decided to build, to the east of the new center, a "nouvelle ville indigène," a new development for Muslims including a palace for the sultan.

A Moroccan Jewish man named Haïm Bendahan, a cereal trader and financier, owned the land and gifted it to the sultan. However, it was not acceptable for a gift of land to be given from a Jew to the sultan, an administration of religious properties, now the Ministry of Hubous and Islamic Affairs, was established to receive and administer the land, and still owns it today. The French orientalist Samuel Biarnay, a friend of Bendahan, was also involved.

The Mosque of Sultan Yusuf was designed by Auguste Cadet and Edmond Brion, and the Mosque of Sultan Muhammad Bin Yusuf was designed by Cadet and built from 1934 to 1936.

Mahkamat al-Pasha, one of the most important buildings in the Hubous, was built 1941–1942.

== See also ==
- Royal Palace of Casablanca
