= List of Art Deco architecture in Africa =

This is a list of buildings that are examples of Art Deco in Africa:

== Algeria ==
- Ahmed Zabana National Museum, Oran
- Cinema Tamgout, Algiers, 1939
- La Gare d'Oran, Algeria, 1922
- Head Office of General Union of Algerian Workers (Union Générale des Travailleurs Algériens), Algiers, 1935
- L'hôpital Baudens, Oran, 1937
- National Museum of Fine Arts (Muséé National des Beaux Arts), Algiers, 1930
- Safir Ex Aletti Hotel, Algiers, 1930

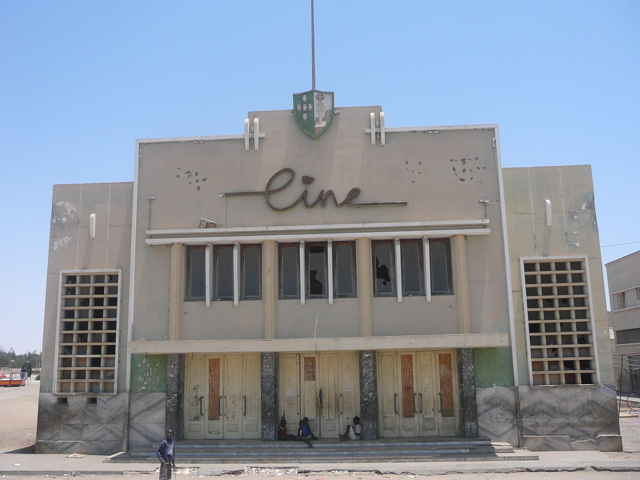
Abandoned cinema, Tômbwa, Namibe Province, Angola

== Angola ==
- California Building, Lobito
- Cine Porto Alexandrense, Tômbwa
- Cine Gimno Desportivo, Huambo
- Cine Moçâmedes, Namibe
- Cine Sporting, Sumbe
- Cine Teatro Arco Iris, Lubango
- Cine Teatro Impérium, Lobito, 1950s
- Cine Teatro Namibe, Namibe
- Cine Tropical, Luanda, 1950s
- Cinema Ruacaná, Huambo
- Cinema Silva Porto, Cuito
- Correios (Post office building), Lobito
- Grande Hotel da Huila, Lubango, 1930s
- Hotel Girão, Kuito
- Tamariz Casino, Lobito
- Victoria Atletico Clube do Bie, Kuito

== Burundi ==
- Burundi Palace Hotel, Bujumbura
- Cinema Cine Cameo, Bujumbura, 1922
- Hospital Rural, Ruyigi
- Hotel Paguidas, Bujumbura
- Leo telecom building, Bujumbura
- Restaurant Tanganyika, Bujumbura, 1930s

== Cape Verde ==
- Banco Comercial do Atlântico, Praia, Santiago
- Câmara Municipal de Santa Catarina, Assomada, Santiago
- Cineclube, Assomada, Santiago
- Cinema de Praia, Praia, Santiago
- Eden Park, Mindelo, São Vicente, 1922
- Electra Power Station, Praia, Santiago
- Hotel Avenida, Assomada, Santiago

== Central African Republic ==
- Grand Cafe, Bangui City
- Hotel de Ville - City Hall, Bangui City, 1947

== Democratic Republic of the Congo (former Zaīre) ==
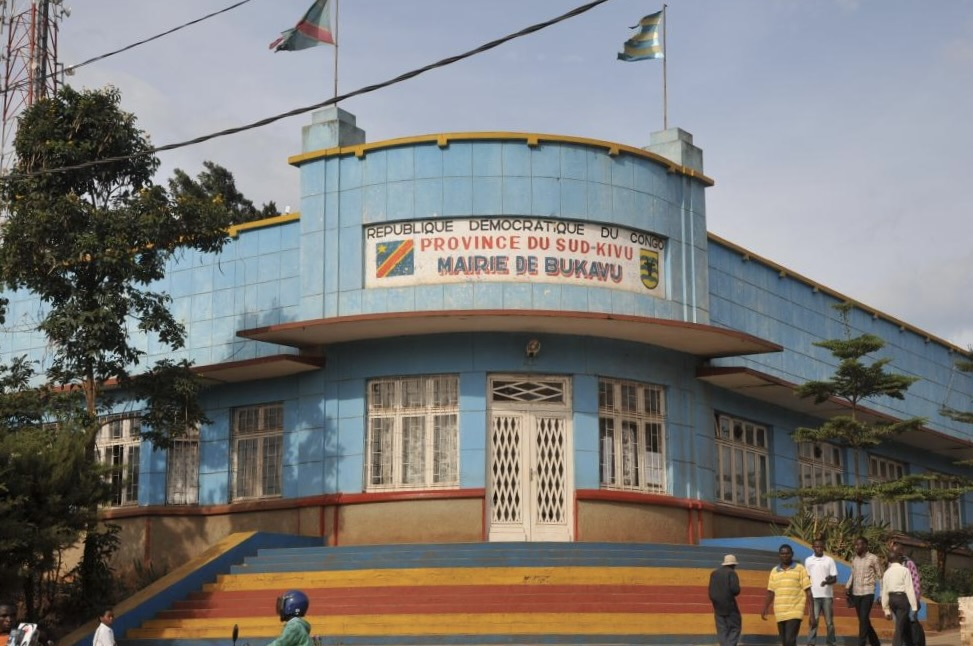
Town Hall (Mairie de Bukavu), Bukavu, Democratic Republic of Congo

- Avenue du Commerce district, Kinshasa
- Cardinal Malula Stadium (Stade Reine Astrid), Kinshasa, 1937
- Central Railway Station, Lubumbashi
- Cinema Central, Kinshasa, 1930s
- Clinique Reine Elisabeth, Kinshasa, 1932
- Collège des Hautes études de stratégie et de défense (formerly the Force Publique Depot), Kinshasa
- Compagnie Industrielle Africaine, Kinshasa, 1928
- Cotex compound, Kinshasa
- Forescom Building, Kinshasa, 1946
- Grand Hotel, Lubumbashi
- Hotel Astoria (now National Institute of Arts, Kinshasa (l'Institut National des Arts), Kinshasa, 1940s
- Hotel Residence (now branch office of SNEL), Kinshasa, 1940s
- Lycée Bosangani and College Boboto (Lycée Sacre Coeur), Kinshasa, 1940s
- Mairie de Bukavu (Town Hall), Bukavu
- Palace of Justice, Lubumbashi
- Park Hotel, Lubumbashi, 1929
- Sabena Guest House, Kinshasa, 1937
- Sts. Peter and Paul Cathedral (Cathédrale Saints Pierre et Paul de Lubumbashi), Lubumbashi, 1920, 1959
- Tony & Tony Mezepolis restaurant, Lubumbashi

== Djibouti ==
- Odeon Cinema, Djibouti

== Egypt ==
- Cinema Amir, Alexandria, 1950
- Metro Cinema, Alexandria, 1949
- Odeon Cinema, Alexandria
- Oreco Building, Alexandria, late 1940s

=== Cairo ===
- Ades Building, Cairo
- Al Bergas 5, Garden City, Cairo
- Cairo Palace Cinema, Cairo, 1945
- Cinema Metro, Cairo, 1939
- Cinema Miami, Cairo, 1949
- Cinema Odeon, 1940s
- Cinema Rivoli, Cairo, 1949
- Cinema Wahba, Cairo
- Diana Palace Cinema, Cairo, 1930
- Foad Serag al Dien, Garden City, Cairo, 1925
- Gobran Apartment Building, Garden City, Cairo, 1929
- Grand Hotel, Cairo
- Hotel Carlton, Cairo, 1935
- Maqha Groppi pastry shop, Cairo, 1925
- Nile House, Cairo
- Rabbat Buildings, Cairo, 1929
- Radio Cinema, Cairo, 1948
- Sabet Building, Corniche El-Nil
- Al-Tahrir Cinema, Giza, Cairo, 1950s
- Yacoubian Building (Cairo), 1937

== Eritrea ==
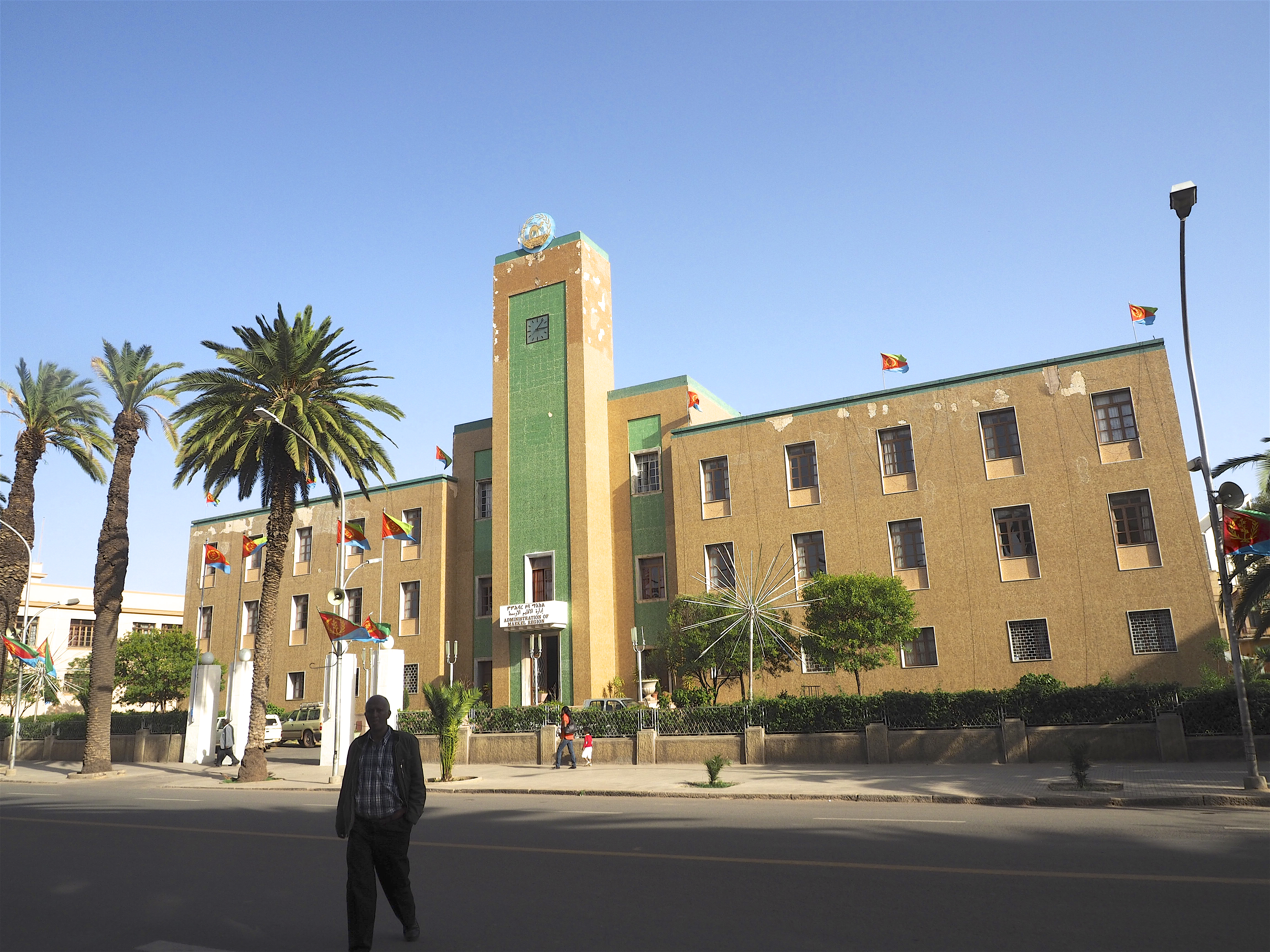
Governor's Palace, Maakel Region administrative building, Asmara, Eritrea

=== Asmara ===
- Alfa Romeo apartments, Asmara, 1937
- Asmara Silicon Factory, Asmara
- Asmara Town Hall, Asmara
- Bar Zilli, Asmara, 1939
- The Bristol Pension Hotel, Asmara, 1940s
- British American Tobacco Company Group Offices, Asmara, 1938
- Central Region Administration Building, Asmara
- Cinema Capitol, Asmara, 1941, 1944
- Cinema Dante, Asmara, 1910
- Cinema Impero, Asmara, 1937
- Cinema Odeon, Asmara, 1937
- Cinema Roma, Asmara, 1937
- Education Ministry (formerly the Fascist Party Headquarters), Asmara, 1928, 1940
- Farmacia Centrale, Asmara
- Fiat Tagliero Building, Asmara, 1938
- Governor's Palace, Asmara, 1930s
- Lloyd's Building, Asmara, 1938
- Medeber Market, Asmara, 1914
- Municipal Building of Asmara, Asmara, 1951
- National Union of Eritrean Women office (formerly Opera Nazionale Dopolavoro), Asmara, 1939
- Palazzo Berti, Asmara, 1939
- Red Sea Pension, Asmara
- Sanitation Office and Garage of the Central Region, Asmara, 1938
- Sede del Gruppo Rion Fascista (Fascist District Group Head Office), Asmara, 1939
- The Selam Hotel, Asmara, 1937
- Shell Service Station, Asmara, 1937
- World Bank Building, Asmara, 1938

== Ghana ==
- Rex Theatre, Accra, 1937
- Roxy Theatre, Accra

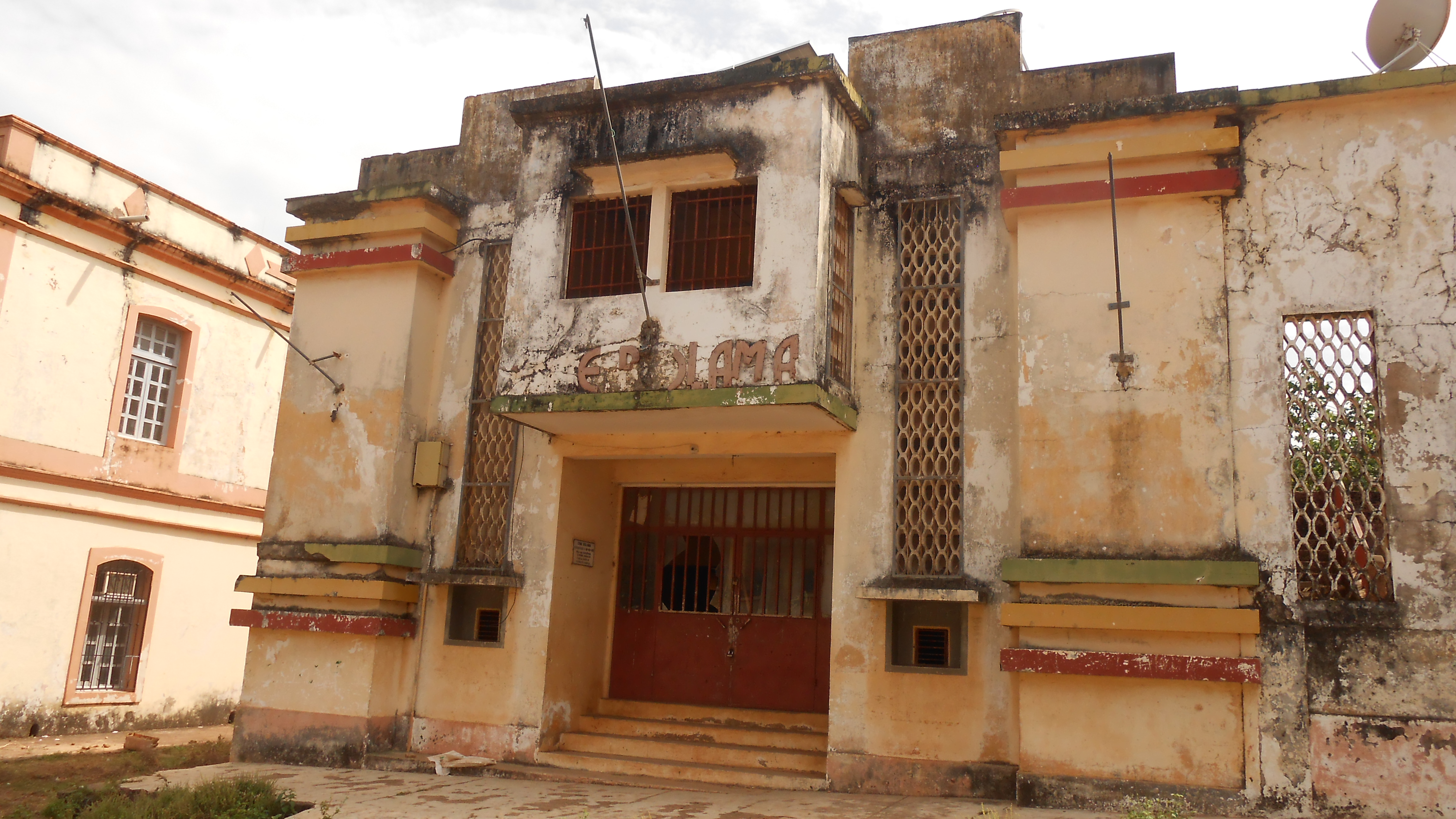
Cine Bolama, Bolama, Sul Province, Guinea-Bissau

== Guinea-Bissau ==
- Cine Bolama, Bolama, Sul Province
- Cine UDIB, Bissau, Guinea-Bissau, 1940s
- Monumento aos Heróis da Independência, Bissau, 1934

== Kenya ==
- Jubilee Insurance Building, Mombasa
- Mulleys Masaa, Machakos, 1955

=== Nairobi ===
- 95 Limuru Road, Nairobi, 1951
- Beneve Coffee House, Nairobi
- City Market, Nairobi
- Kenchic Inn, Nairobi
- Kenwood House, Nairobi, 1936
- Kenya National Theatre, Nairobi, 1951
- Nanak House, Nairobi, 1920s
- Pioneer House Kenyatta Avenue, Nairobi, 1930s
- Shan Cinema, Nairobi
- Simla House, Nairobi
- Sirocco House, Lake Naivasha
- Sirona House, Nairobi
- Skyline Business Institute, Nairobi

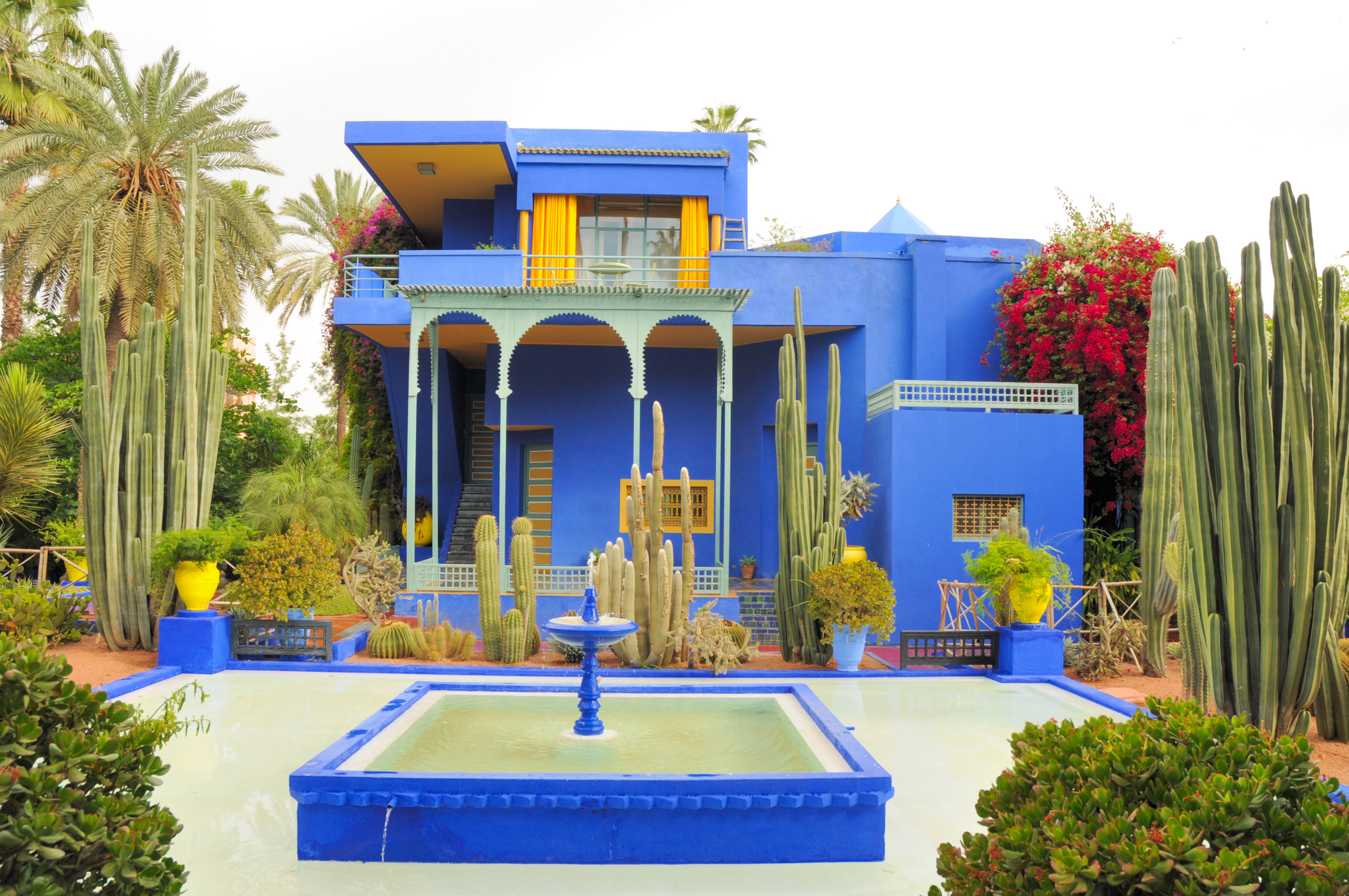
Jardin de Majorelle, Marrakesh, Morocco

== Morocco ==
- Avenida Theater, Tetouan, 1945
- Cathédrale Saint-Pierre de Rabat, Rabat, Morocco, 1919-1930s
- Cinema Avenida, Sidi Ifni
- Cinema Camera, Meknes, 1938
- Cinéma le Colisée, Marrakesh, 1953
- Cinéma Rif, Tangier, 1948
- Cinéma Royal, Rabat
- Cinéma Roxy, Tangier
- Gran Teatro Cervantes, Tangier, 1913
- Guard Tower, El Ouatia, Tan Tan Beach
- Hotel de Ville, Sidi Ifni
- Jardin Majorelle, (and the Museum of Berber History), Marrakesh, 1929
- Ship House, Sidi Ifni
- former Spanish Consulate, Sidi Ifni

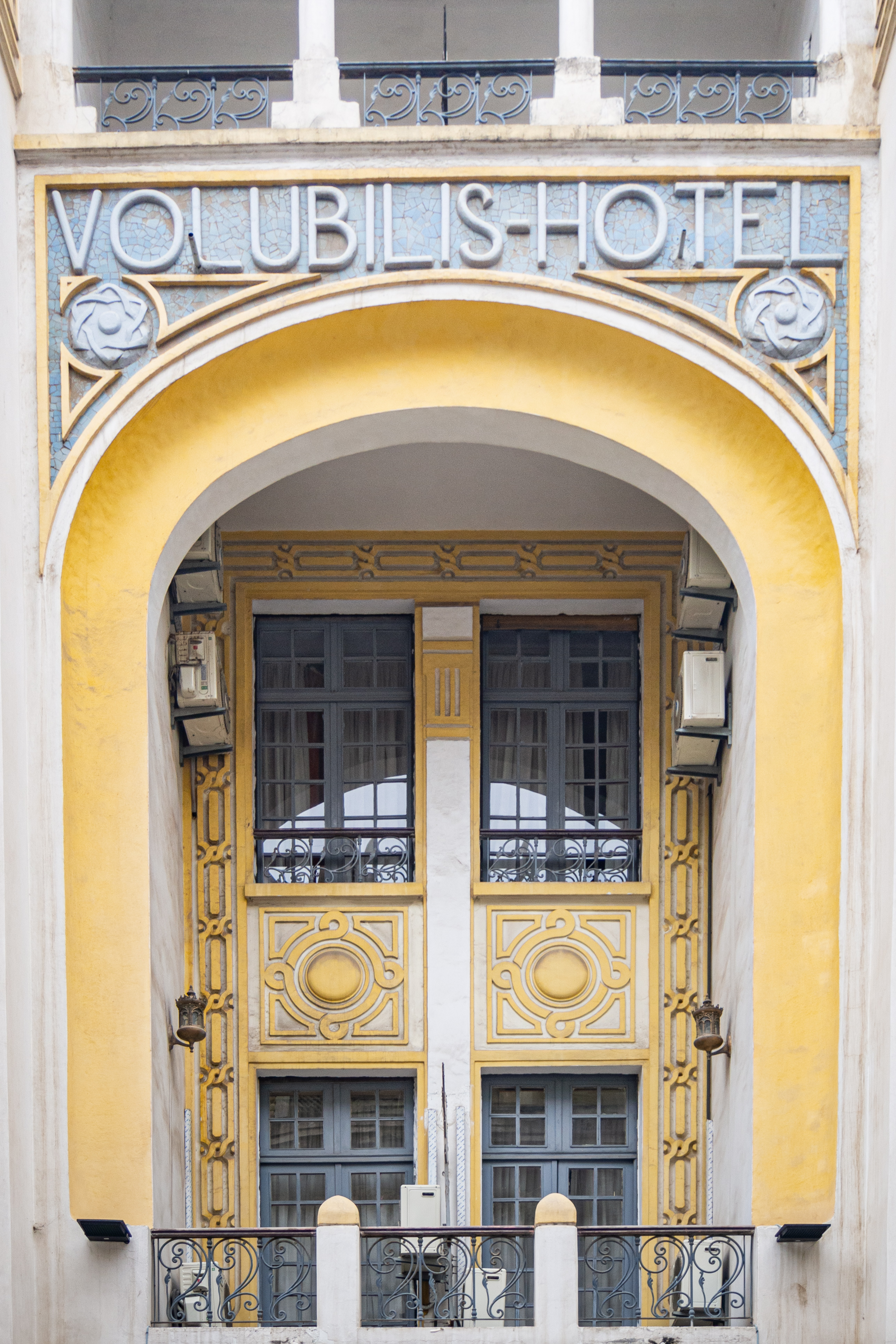
Hotel Volubilis, Casablanca, Morocco

=== Casablanca ===
- Abderrahman Slaoui Museum, Casablanca, 1940s
- Assayag Building, Casablanca, 1932
- Bank al-Maghrib, Casablanca
- Bar Atomic, Casablanca
- Bendahan Building, Casablanca, 1935
- Le Cabestan, La Corniche, Casablanca, 1927
- Café Champs Elysées, built in the shape of a cruise liner, Casablanca
- Casablanca Cathedral (Église du Sacré-Cœur de Casablanca), Casablanca, 1930
- Central Post Office, Casablanca, 1920
- Cinéma ABC, Casablanca
- Cinéma Atlas, Casablanca
- Cinéma Le Verdun, Casablanca
- Cinéma Lynx, Casablanca, 1950s
- Cinema Rialto, Casablanca, 1930
- Church of the Sacred Heart, Casablanca, 1930
- El Glaoui Building, Casablanca, 1927
- Grande Poste, Casablanca, 1918
- Hotel Colisee, Casablanca
- Hotel Excelsior, Casablanca, 1918
- Hotel Guynemer, Casablanca, 1909
- Hotel Lincoln, Casablanca, 1917
- Hotel Transatlantique, Casablanca, 1922
- Hotel Volubilis, Casablanca, 1920
- IMCAMA Building, Casablanca, 1928
- Immeuble Moretti-Milone, Casablanca, 1934
- Imperial Casablanca Hotel & Spa (former Shell Building), Casablanca, 1934
- Lévy-Bendayan Building, Casablanca, 1928
- Marius Boyer house, Casablanca, 1930
- Moses Assayag Building, Casablanca, 1932
- Old Abattoirs (former slaughterhouse), Casablanca, 1912, 1922
- Palais de Justice, Casablanca, 1925
- Villa Suissa, Casablanca, 1947
- La Villa des Arts, Casablanca, 1930s
- Wilaya City Hall administrative building, with Clock Tower, Casablanca, 1927–1936

=== Fez ===
- Bank of Morocco, Yacoub el Mansour Square, Fez
- Café de la Renaissance, Fez, 1930
- Central Post Office, Fez, 1947
- Cinéma Arc en Ciel, Fez
- Cinéma Astor, Fez
- Cinéma Bijou, Fez, 1930
- Cinéma Boujloud, Fez
- Cour d'Appel, Fez, 1936
- General Treasury of the Kingdom, Fez, 1935
- Grand Hôtel, Fez, 1929
- Raulin Building, Fez, 1930
- Rex Cinema, Fez, 1942

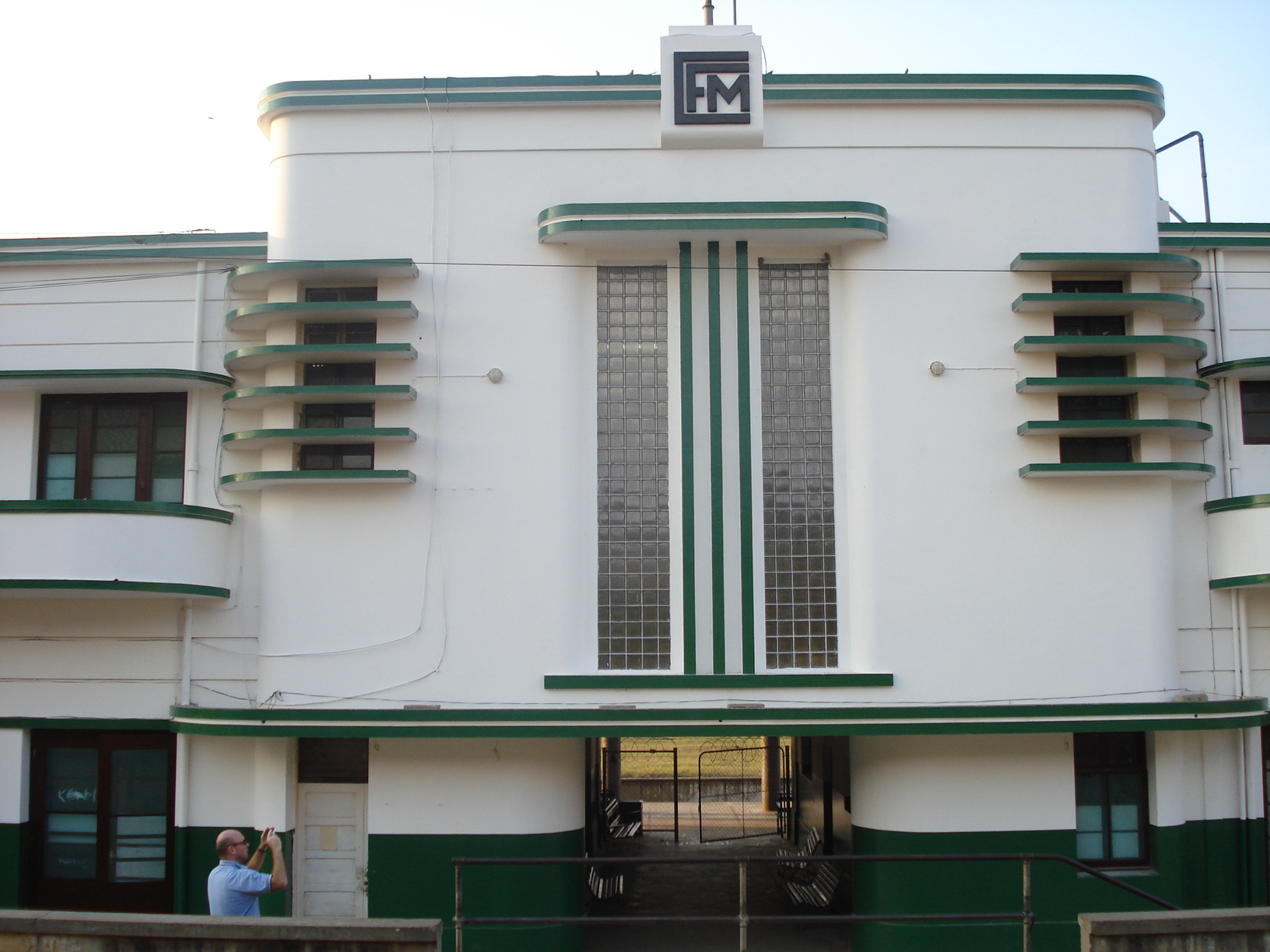
Train Station, Ressano Garcia, Mozambique

== Mozambique ==
- Central Firefighters' Headquarters, Beira, 1940s
- Cine-Teatro Olympia (now a church), Beira
- Cine-Teatro Tofo, Inhambane
- Damião de Melo House - Verdinho Restaurant, Inhambane, 1940
- Grande Hotel Beira, Beira, 1954
- Hotel Dona Ana, Vilanculos
- Municipal council building, Quelimane
- Nova Zuid LDA shopping center, Nampula
- Post Office (Estação de correios), Tete
- Railway Station, Ressano Garcia
- Train Station, Malema
- Train Station, Ressano Garcia

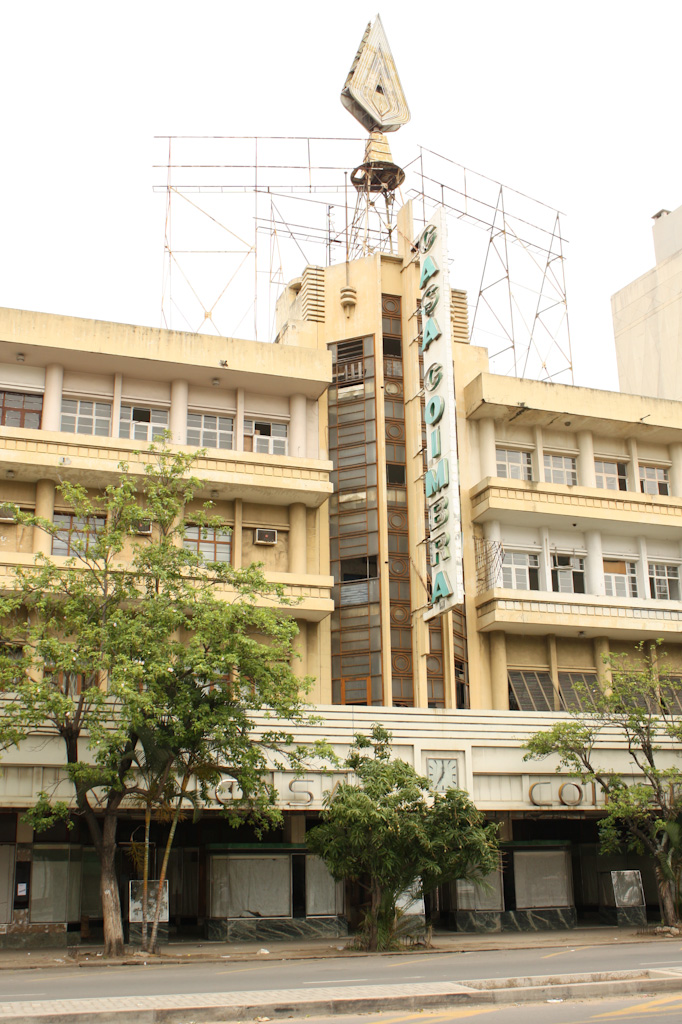
Casa Coimbra, Maputo, Mozambique

=== Maputo ===
Maputo, the capital of Mozambique, has a rich Art Deco heritage from the Portuguese colonial period (1781–1976), when the city was called Lourenço Marques.

- Abel da Silva Pascoal building (Lau Cam Soi), Maputo, 1946
- Bharat Samaj Ved Mandir Hindu Temple, Maputo, 1938
- Café Continental, Maputo
- Casa Coimbra, Maputo, 1940
- Casa Rubi, Maputo
- Catedral de Nossa Senhora da Imaculada Conceição (Cathedral of Our Lady of the Immaculate Conception), Maputo, 1944
- Cine Africa, Maputo, 1948
- Cine Gil Vicente, Maputo, 1933
- Cinema Scala, Maputo, 1931
- Clube Ferroviário (The Railway Club), Maputo, 1946
- Edifício Karmali, Maputo, 1930
- Embassy of Portugal, Maputo
- Hotel-Escola Andalucia, Maputo, 1946
- National Organization of Teachers Headquarters, Maputo
- National School of Dance, Maputo
- Rádio de Moçambique (formerly the Rádio Clube de Moçambique), Maputo, 1931
- Portuguese Embassy, Maputo
- Prédio Rubi building, Maputo
- Radio Mozambique Building, Maputo, 1933
- Telecomunicações de Moçambique (Mozambique Telephone building), KaMpfumo district, Maputo

== Namibia ==
- Villa Margherita, Swakopmund

== Nigeria ==
- Bower's Tower, Ibadan

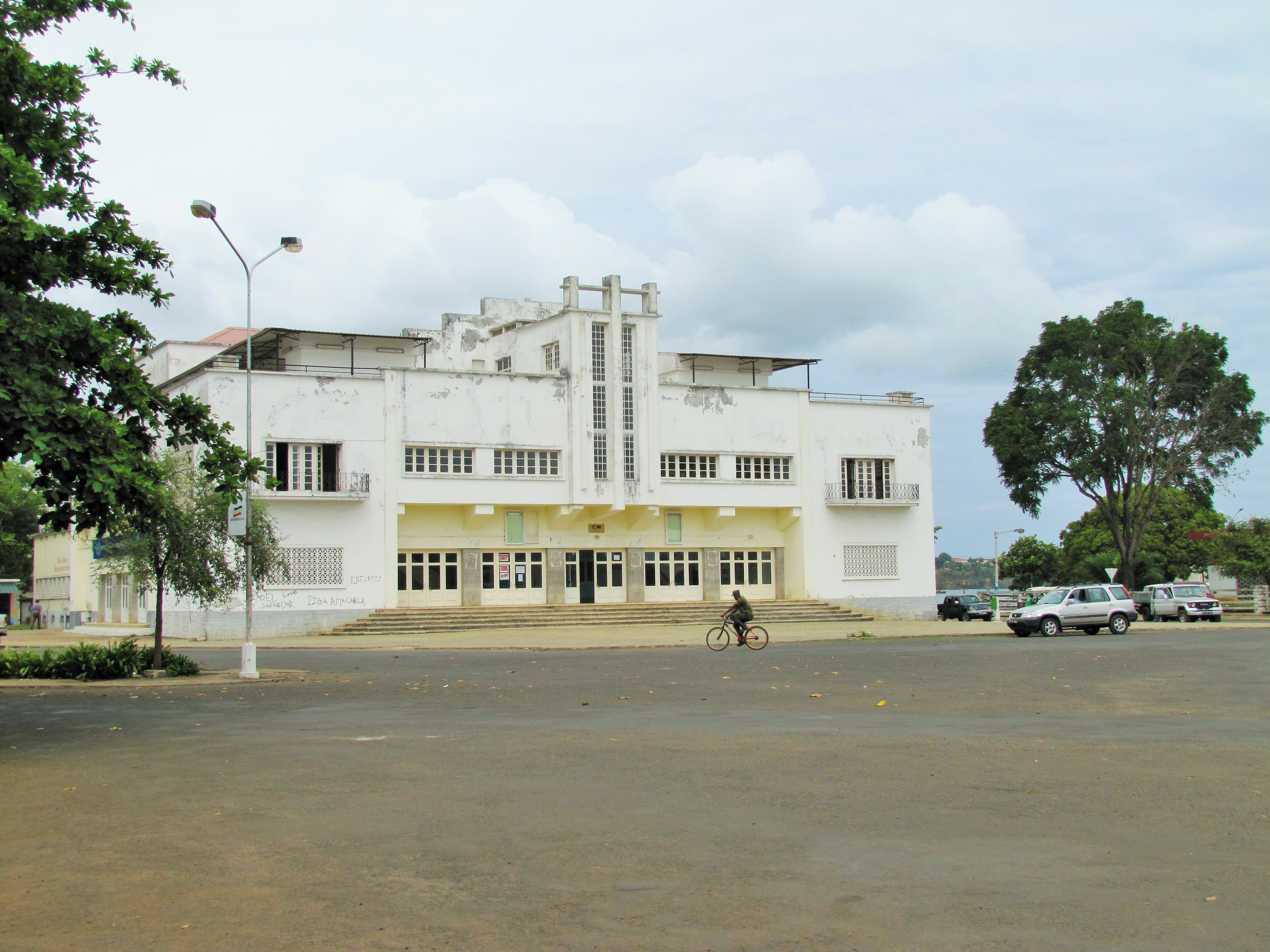
Cineteatro Marcelo da Veiga, São Tomé and Príncipe

== São Tomé and Príncipe ==
- Cineteatro Marcelo da Veiga, Água Grande, São Tomé, 1950

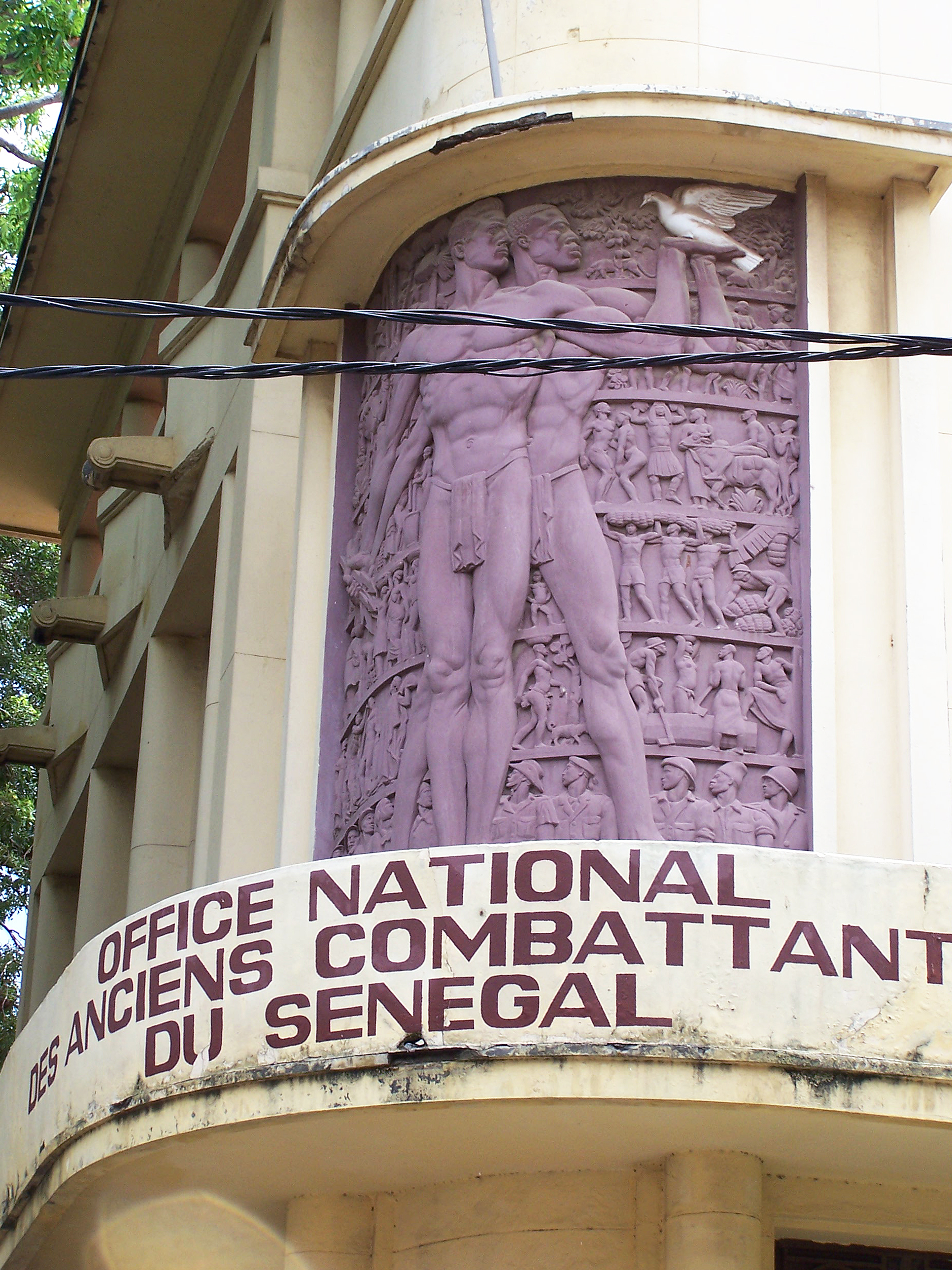
National Office of Veterans Affairs, Dakar, Senegal

== Senegal ==
- Embassy of Russia, Dakar
- Hôpital Institut d'Hygiène Social de Dakar, Dakar
- IFAN Museum of African Arts (Musée Théodore Monod d'Art Africain), Dakar, 1938
- Institut Pasteur de Dakar (IPD, Pasteur Institute), Dakar, 1928
- National Office of Veterans Affairs (Office national des Anciens Combattants), Dakar
- Our Lady of Victories Cathedral, Dakar, 1936

== Somalia ==
- Villa Somalia, Mogadishu, 1922–1936
- Hotel Croce del Sud, Mogadishu, 1938

== South Africa ==
- Apollo Theatre, Victoria, Karoo, 1920s
- Avalon Sweets and Chocolate Center (formerly Avalon Building), Kariega, Eastern Cape
- Commercial Building at 1467 Main, Paarl, Western Cape, 1935
- Crown Cork Factory, Isando, Kempton Park, Gauteng, 1951
- DaVinci Building, Worcester, Western Cape
- Germiston Central Fire Station, Germiston, Gauteng, 1935
- Kasteel Motors, Riebeeck Kasteel, Western Cape,
- Kavenda Building (now a furniture store, formerly Selworth's), Nigel, Gauteng
- KMV Wine Emporium (Dr André du Toit-Gebou/Building), Paarl, Western Cape
- La Rochelle Girls' High School Hostel, Paarl, Western Cape, 1935
- La Rochelle Girls' Primary School, Paarl, Western Cape, 1935
- Merlyn Court commercial building, Cannon Hill, Kariega, Eastern Cape, 1930s
- former Plaza Theatre, Cannon Hill, Kariega, Eastern Cape, 1930s
- Prince Albert Liquor Store (formerly petrol station), Prince Albert, Western Cape, 1944
- Protea Building (former Protea Cinema), Paarl, Western Cape, 1939
- Public Library, Fraserburg, Northern Cape
- Quick Lane Upington commercial building, Upington, Northern Cape
- Rand Airport, Germiston, Ekhuruleni, 1920s
- The Showroom Theatre, Prince Albert, Western Cape,
- former Standard Bank, Worcester, Western Cape
- Tiger Brands Jam manufacturing building (formerly H. Jones and Co. building), Paarl, additions 1939
- Union House, Nigel, Gauteng
- Voortrekker Monument, Pretoria, 1949

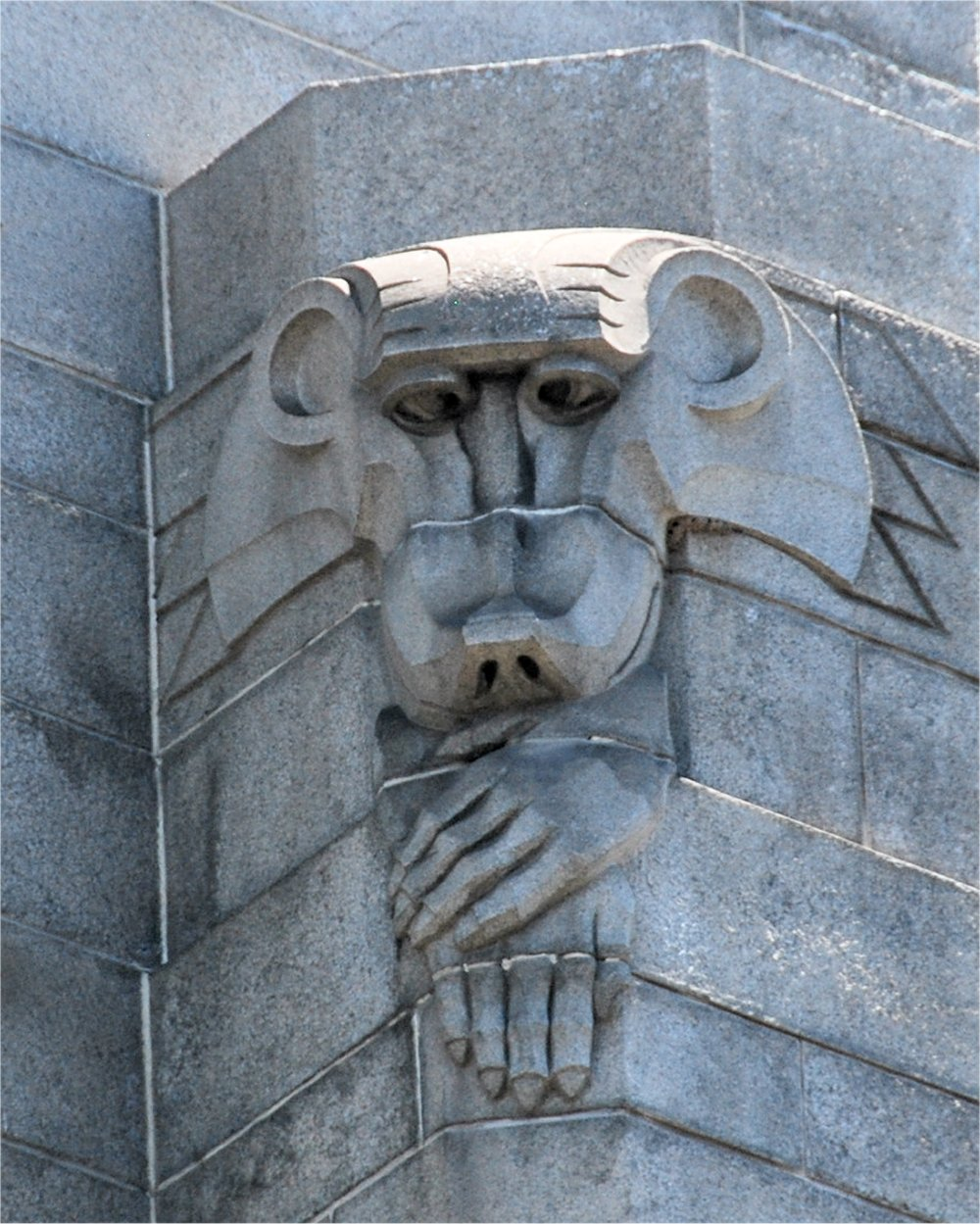
Detail of Mutual Heights Building, Cape Town, South Africa

=== Cape Town ===
- Adderey Park parking garage (formerly Geneva House flats), 1935
- Balmoral Flats (formerly Balmoral Hotel), Muizenberg, Cape Town, 1932, 1939
- former Bijou Theater, Observatory, Cape Town, 1940
- Botanik Social House (formerly Land and Agricultural Bank of South Africa), City Centre, Cape Town, 1938
- Cape Town General Post Office Grand Central, Cape Town
- Commercial building (formerly Scott's Building), City Centre, Cape Town, 1932
- Dorchester Apartments, Sea Point, Cape Town, 1935
- Downtown Lodge Residence, Zonnebloem, Cape Town
- Government Motor Transport building at 34 Roeland St., Cape Town, 1940
- Holiday Court flats (formerly Hamoaze Court), Simons Town, Cape Town, 1935
- Holyrood Apartment Building, City Centre, Cape Town, 1939
- Kimberley House, Greenmarket Square, Cape Town
- Majestic Mansions, Muizenberg, Cape Town
- Market House, Greenmarket Square, Cape Town, 1930
- Mutual Heights Building (formerly SA Mutual life Assurance Society), City Centre, Cape Town, 1940
- Namaqua House Apartments, Greenmarket Square, Cape Town, 1933
- ONOMO Hotels Cape Town Inn on the Square, Greenmarket Square, Cape Town (formerly Shell House), 1929, 1941
- Solent Court flats, Simons Town, Cape Town, 1935
- Private Collections furniture store (former Synagogue), Vredehoek, Cape Town
- Spar groceries at Cape Quarter Lifestyle Village, Cape Town
- former Stakesby-Lewis Hostel, Zonnebloem, Cape Town, 1936
- Synagogue, Sea Point, Cape Town,

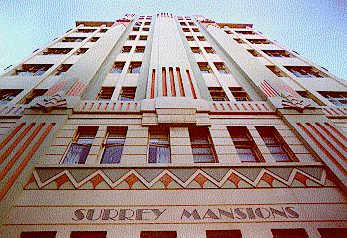
Surrey Mansions, Durban, KwaZulu Natal, South Africa

=== Durban ===
- 29 Umbilo Road, Greyville, Durban, 1935
- 69/71 Beatrice Street, Durban, 1939
- Aboobaker Mansions, Durban, 1937
- Adam's Booksellers, Durban
- Albany Hotel, Durban, 1938
- Alder Court, Durban, 1940
- Althea Court, Durban, 1933
- Ambassador House, Durban, 1930
- Astra Court, Musgrave Road, Durban, 1937
- Bales Court, Durban
- Berea Court, Berea, Durban, 1937
- Broadway Court, Durban, 1933
- Broadwindsor Court, Durban, 1935
- The Cenotaph, Durban, 1926
- Chester House, Durban
- Cheviot Court, Durban 1940s
- Clicks building, Durban
- Colonial Mutual Building, Durban, 1933
- Coral Court, Durban
- Deo Valente, Durban, 1940
- Devonshire Court, Durban
- Dominion Court, Durban
- D'Urban building, Durban
- Ebrahim Court, Durban
- The Edward, (Protea Hotel by Marriott Durban Edward), South Beach, Durban, 1909
- Empire Court, Durban
- Enterprise Building, Durban, 1931
- Essop Moosa Building, Durban
- Fallodon, Durban, 2000
- Gloms Court, Durban
- Gleneagles, Durban
- Hattia Trust, Durban
- Heronmere, Durban
- Hertford, Musgrave Road, Durban, 1998
- Himat Court/Avni Court, Durban, 1942
- Hollywood Court, Durban, 1937
- Janora Court, Durban
- Jubilee Court, Morningside, Durban
- Kintyre, Glenwood, Durban
- Lowry's Corner, Musgrave Road, Durban
- Manhattan Court, Durban, 1937
- McIntosh House, Durban, 1935
- Memorial Tower Building (University of KwaZulu-Natal, Howard College Campus), Durban, 1948, 1972
- Metropole Apartments
- Nordbury building, Durban
- Nordic Court, Durban, 1933, 1938
- Pavo Court, Durban, 1940
- Pixley House, Durban, 1938
- Plymouth Hoe, Durban, 1936
- Prefcor House (formerly Payne Brothers Building), Durban
- Quadrant House, Victoria Embankment, Durban
- Sedson's Building, Durban
- St. Aubyn Court, Musgrave Road, Durban, 1940s
- Suncoast Casino, Snell Parade, Berea, Durban, 2003
- Surat Hindoo Association Building, Durban
- Surrey Mansions, Berea, Durban, 1937
- Victoria Mansions, Durban, 1935
- Westgard House - Trust Building, Durban, 1939
- Whittington Court, Durban
- Willern Court, Durban, 1937
- Yagashree Mansions, Durban, 1927

=== Eastern Cape ===
- Aldwyn Towers Court, Central Port Elizabeth, Eastern Cape, 1937
- Berkeley Court flats, Summerstrand, Port Elizabeth, Eastern Cape, 1934, 1990s
- Club de Catz (formerly Porter's Ltd), North End, Port Elizabeth, 1933
- Court Receife flats, Summerstrand, Port Elizabeth, 1937
- Taylor House (housing Epitomy Financial Services), Central, Port Elizabeth, 1935
- Hampton Court student accommodation, Central, Port Elizabeth, 1937
- Harrodene flats, Summerstrand, Port Elizabeth
- Hotel Campanile, Central, Port Elizabeth, 1934
- House GL Lippsteu, Redhouse, Port Elizabeth, 1938
- Marley Building Systems (formerly Cadbury-Fry factory), Holland Park, Port Elizabeth, 1937
- Mastercars offices (formerly Dawson Court flats), North End, Port Elizabeth, 1937
- Noninzi Luzipho Building (formerly Colonial Mutual Life Insurance Building - Pleinhuis), Port Elizabeth, 1934
- Saraphile Mansions, Central, Port Elizabeth, 1926
- Saville House flats, Central, Port Elizabeth, 1935
- Shoprite (formerly OK Bazaars), Central, Port Elizabeth, 1937
- St Saviour's Anglican Church, Walmer, Port Elizabeth, 1942
- Victoria Hotel, Central, Port Elizabeth, 1931
- Whitehall Court flats, Central, Port Elizabeth, 1939
- YMCA-CVJM, Central Port Elizabeth, 1936

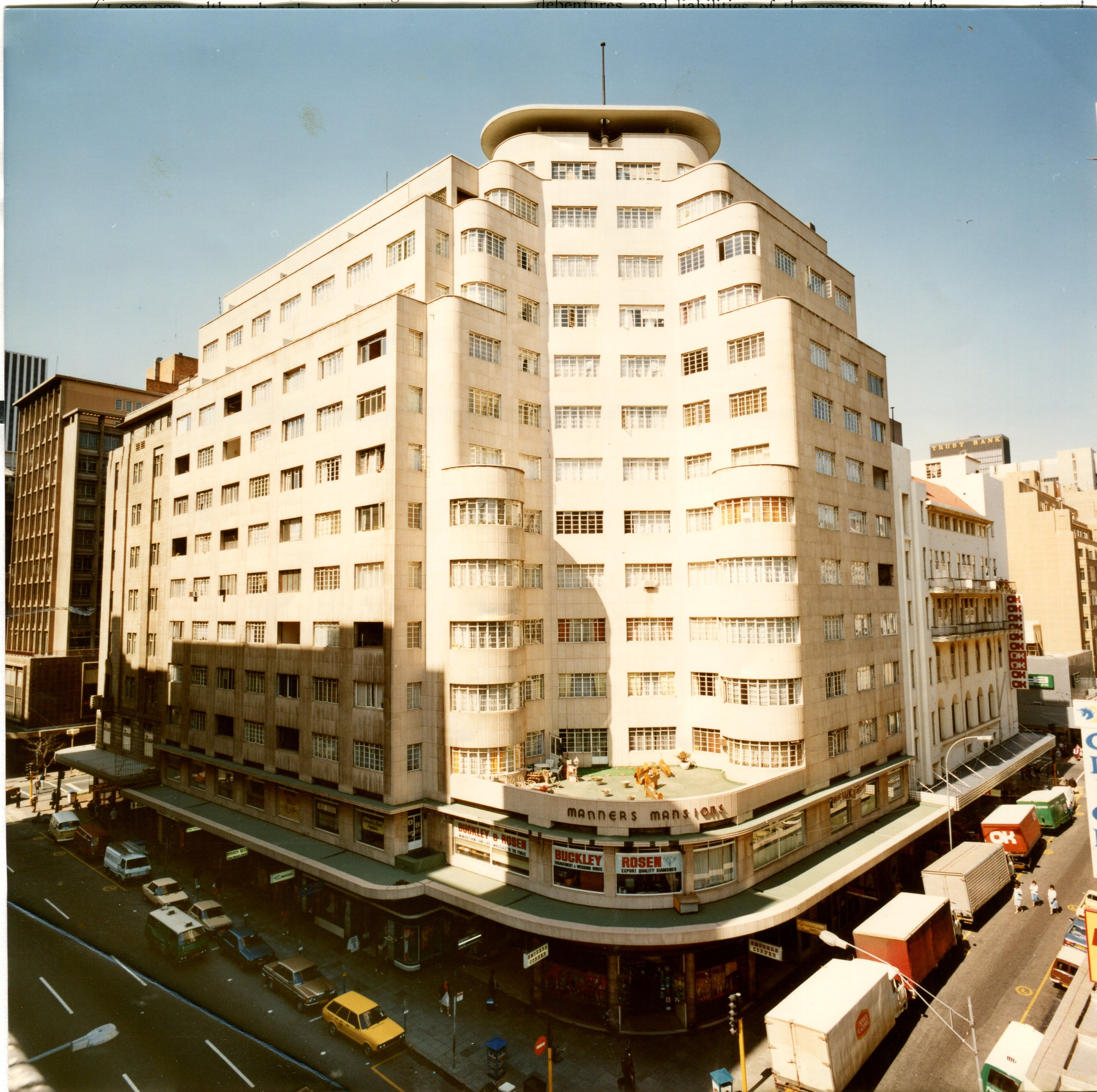
AManners Mansions, Johannesburg, Gauteng, South Africa

=== Johannesburg ===
- Aegis Building, Johannesburg,
- Anglo American Corporation headquarters, Johannesburg, 1938
- Barbican, Johannesburg, 1929
- Ansteys Building, Johannesburg, 1937
- Astor Mansions, Johannesburg, 1932
- Atkinson House, Johannesburg, 1936
- Aventry Court apartments, Johannesburg
- Castle Beer Hall (now Ram International Insurance Brokers), Johannesburg, 1939
- Daventry Court apartments, Killarney, Johannesburg, 1934
- Delta Environmental Centre, Johannesburg, 1934
- Dorchester Mansions, Johannesburg
- Duncan House student accommodation (formerly Lintons Hotel), Johannesburg, 1930
- Elgin Court, Johannesburg
- Eskom Building, Johannesburg
- Forty Fox Street, Johannesburg
- Gallo House, Johannesburg, 1949
- Gleneagles, Killarney, Johannesburg, 1937
- Helvetia Court, Bellevue, Johannesburg, 1936
- His Majesty's building, Johannesburg
- House Naude, 42 8th Avenue, Houghton, Johannesburg, 1936
- Killarney Court, Killarney, Johannesburg
- former Luxor Court, Bertrams, Johannesburg
- Manners Mansions, Johannesburg, 1940
- Mentone Court, Killarney, Johannesburg, 1935
- Normandie Court apartments, Johannesburg, 1937
- Post Office, Jeppen Street, Johannesburg, 1935
- Stanhope Mansions, Johannesburg, 1935
- Strathearn Mansions, Johannesburg, 1931
- Temple Israel, Johannesburg, 1936
- Union Castle Building, Johannesburg

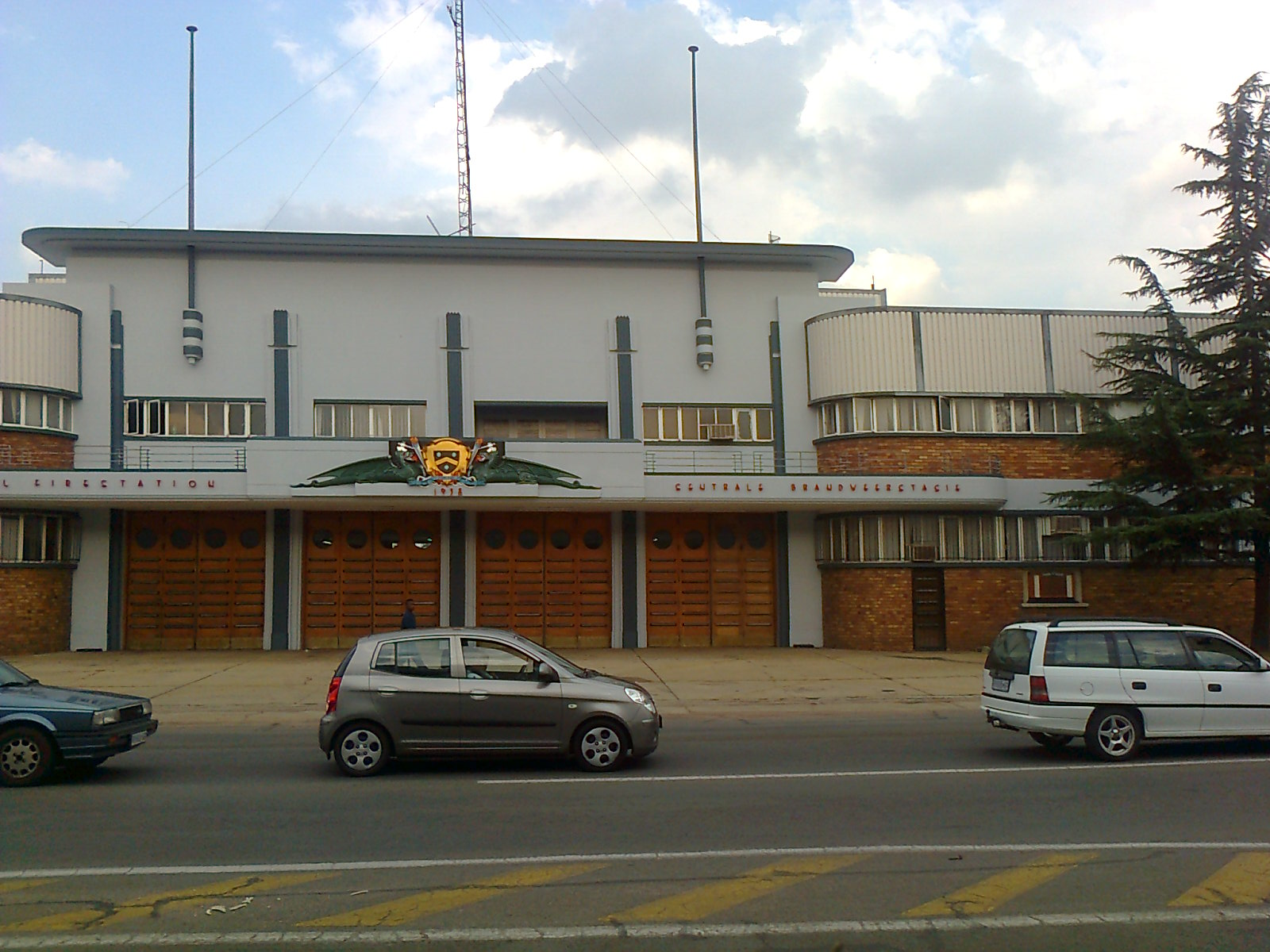
Springs Central Fire Station, Springs, Gauteng, South Africa

=== Springs, Gauteng ===
- Carlou Court apartments, Springs, Gauteng, 1933
- Central Fire Station, Springs, Gauteng, 1938
- Century Cinema (now Magic Motor Spares), Springs, Gauteng, 1939
- Josette Towers flats, Springs, Gauteng, 1935
- Manitoba House apartments, Springs, Gauteng, 1930
- Marie Court flats, Springs, Gauteng, 1936
- NUMSA Labor Union headquarters, Springs, Gauteng
- Nureef House apartments, Springs, Gauteng, 1935
- PAM Brink Rugby Stadium, Springs, Gauteng, 1944
- Renesta House, Springs, Gauteng
- Southern Building, Springs, Gauteng
- Springs Central Business Centre, Springs, Gauteng
- Springs Central Fire Station, Springs, Gauteng, 1938
- Springs Hotel, Springs, Gauteng, 1932
- Wandel Court flats, Springs, Gauteng, 1949

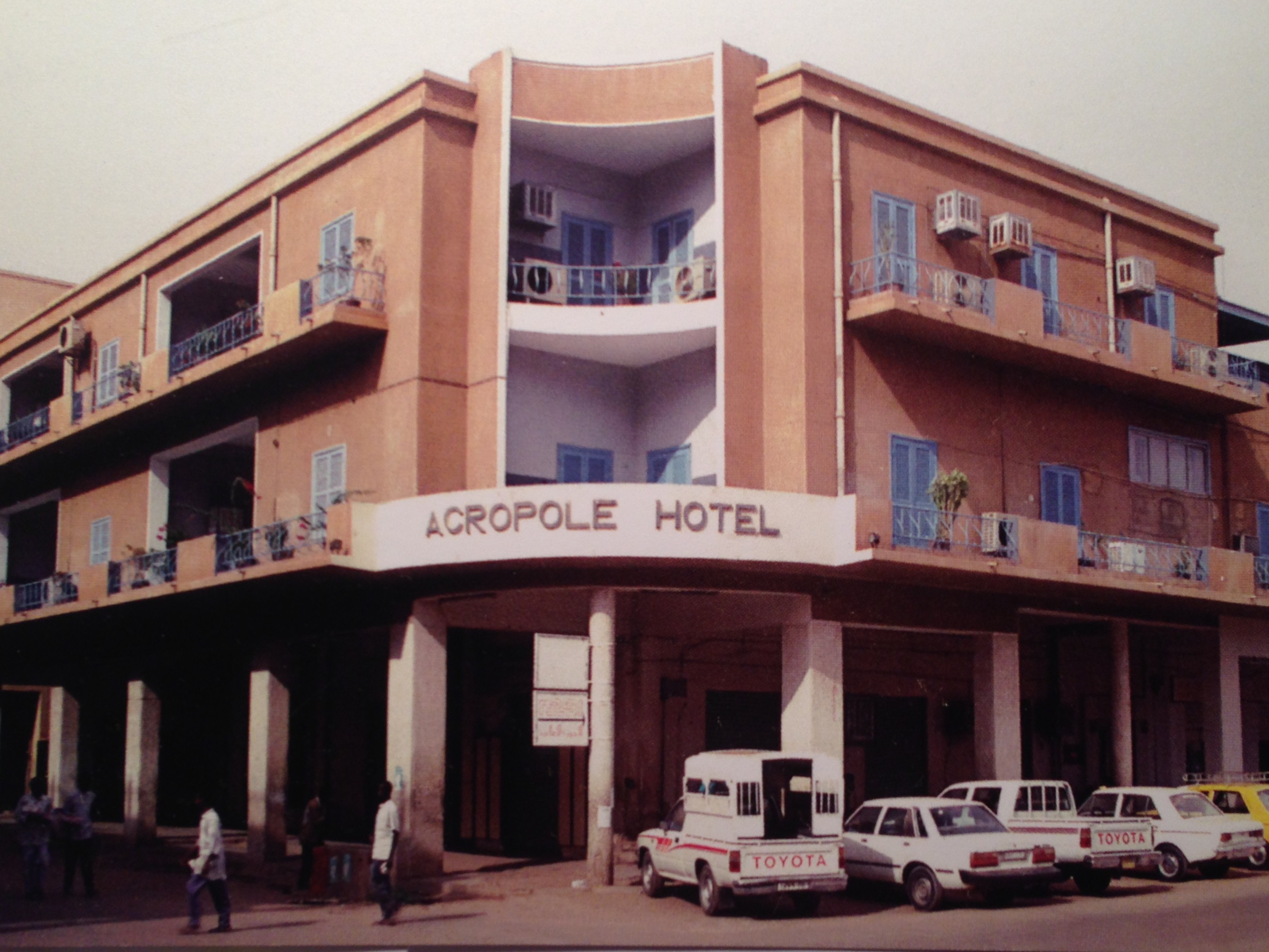
Acropole Hotel, Khartoum, Sudan

== Sudan ==
- Coliseum Cinema, Khartoum, 1935
- Halfaya Cinema, Khartoum, 1950s
- Acropole Hotel, Khartoum, 1952

== Tanzania ==
- Cine Afrique (now a supermarket), Zanzibar
- The Diamond Jubilee Building, Dar es Salaam
- The Majestic Theatre, Zanzibar, 1920s, 1955
- Nefaland Hotel, Dar es Salaam
- Palm Beach Hotel, Dar es Salaam, 1950s
- Rupam Stores, Dar es Salaam, 1938–1948

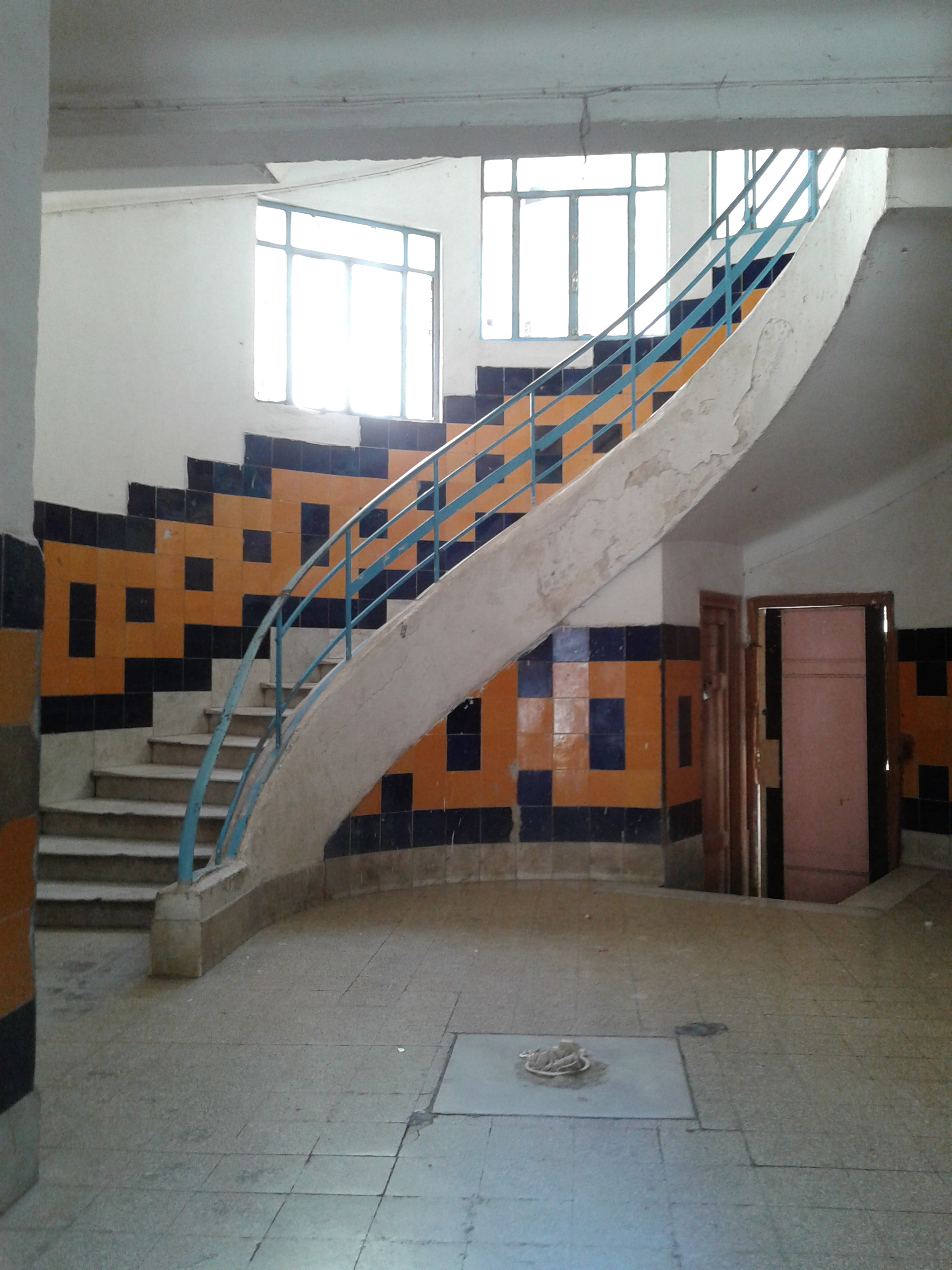
Staircase of building on Rue du Docteur Cassar, Hafsia, Tunis, Tunisia

== Tunisia ==
- 12, rue d'Égypte, Tunis
- Cinema ABC, Tunis, 1950
- Le Colisée building, Tunis
- De Carlo building, Tunis
- ENICAR building, Tunis, 1933f
- Great Synagogue, Tunis, 1938
- L'hôtel de Ville, Carthage
- Immeuble Le Colisée, Tunis
- Immeuble De Carlo, Tunis
- Immeuble La Nationale, Tunis
- Immeuble Notarbartolo, Tunis
- Immeuble du petit Colisée, Tunis
- Immeuble Ritz, Tunis
- Immeuble Tabone, Tunis
- Maison in Tribunal Plaza, Tunis
- Maison Resplandy, Tunis
- La Nationale building, Tunis
- Notarbartolo building, Tunis
- Poste du Belvédère, Tunis
- Ritz building, Tunis
- Tabone building, Tunis
- Villa Boublil, Tunis

== Uganda ==
- Fat Cat Backpackers hostel, Kampala
- Kampala Train Station, Kampala
- Madlani Building, 1948
- Norman Cinema (now Watoto Church), Kampala, 1950s
- Odeon – Cinema Hall, Jinja
- Plot 44, Rashid Khamis Road (former petrol station), Kampala, 1930s

== Zambia ==
- Capitol Theatre, Livingstone
- Stanley House offices, Livingstone, 1931

== See also ==
- List of Art Deco architecture
- Art Deco topics
- Streamline Moderne architecture
