= List of Art Deco architecture =

This is a list of buildings that are examples of Art Deco:

- List of Art Deco architecture in Africa
- List of Art Deco architecture in Asia
- List of Art Deco architecture in Europe
- List of Art Deco architecture in the Americas
  - List of Art Deco architecture in the United States
- List of Art Deco architecture in Oceania

== See also ==
- Art Deco topics
- Streamline Moderne architecture
