= Casablanca Cathedral =

Former Catholic church in Casablanca, Morocco

- Church of the Sacred Heart
- Église du Sacré-Cœur de Casablanca
- The former cathedral in 2023
- Casablanca Cathedral
- 33°35′28″N 7°37′28″W
- Address: Casablanca
- Country: Morocco
- Denomination: Catholic Church (former)
- Churchmanship: Latin Rite

History
- Status: Church (1930–1956)

Architecture
- Functional status: Inactive
- Architect: Paul Tournon
- Architectural type: Church
- Style: Art Deco
- Completed: 1930
- Closed: 1956

Administration
- Archdiocese: Rabat

The Casablanca Cathedral (Arabic: كاتدرائية الدار البيضاء, French: Cathédrale de Casablanca), or Church of the Sacred Heart (Arabic: كنيسة القلب المقدس, French: Église du Sacré-Cœur), is a former church located west of the Arab League Park in Casablanca, Morocco.

== Overview ==
The Casablanca Cathedral was constructed in 1930. The former church ceased its religious function in 1956, after the independence of Morocco. It subsequently became a cultural centre which is open to visitors. It has hosted numerous art exhibitions. The Institut Français in Casablanca organized an electronic music night inside the nave of the former church on October 10, 2015.

The church was designed by French architect Paul Tournon, in the Art Deco style. It is commonly referred to as a cathedral, although in reality, it has never technically been one as it was never the seat of a bishop.

== Gallery ==
The cathedral during construction

Casablanca Cathedral

== See also ==
- St. Peter's Cathedral, Rabat
- French Church of Tangier
- Catholic Church in Morocco
- List of Art Deco architecture in Africa
