= IMCAMA Building =

- Immeuble de l'IMCAMA
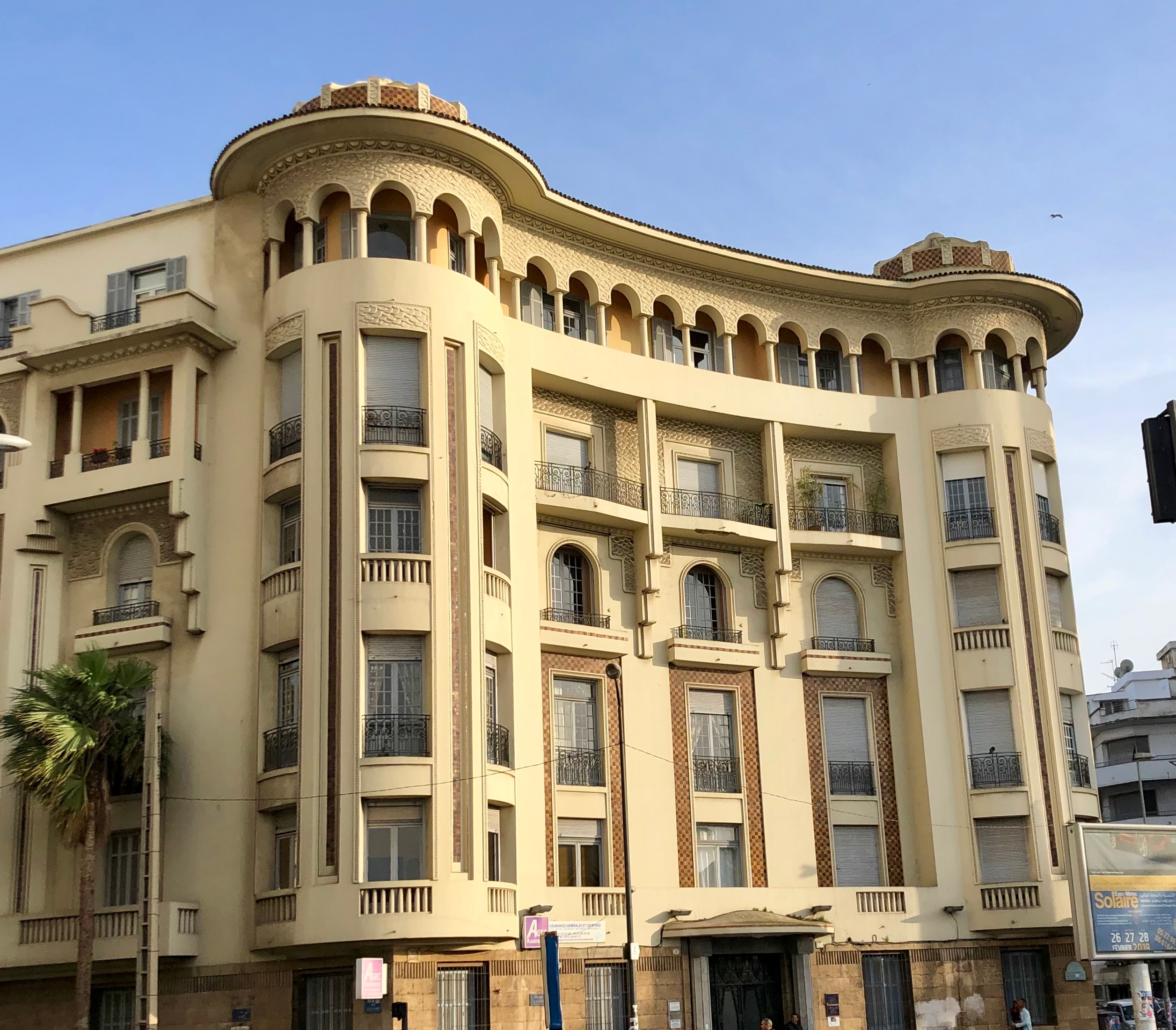
- Façade of the IMCAMA Building in Casablanca, Morocco

- Location within Morocco

General information
- Location: Casablanca, Morocco
- Coordinates: 33°35′15″N 7°37′15″W

The IMCAMA Building (French: Immeuble de l'IMCAMA), also known informally as the Sony Building (Immeuble Sony) is an Art Deco building in Casablanca, Morocco. It is located at Place Saint-Exupéry, at the junction of Lorraine Boulevard and Agadir Street.

It was designed by Albert Greslin in 1928. It faces the Arab League Park.

== Name ==
"IMCAMA" stands for Société Immobilière de Casablanca et Maroc.
