= Arab League Park =

Moroccan cultural heritage site

- حديقة جامعة الدول العربية
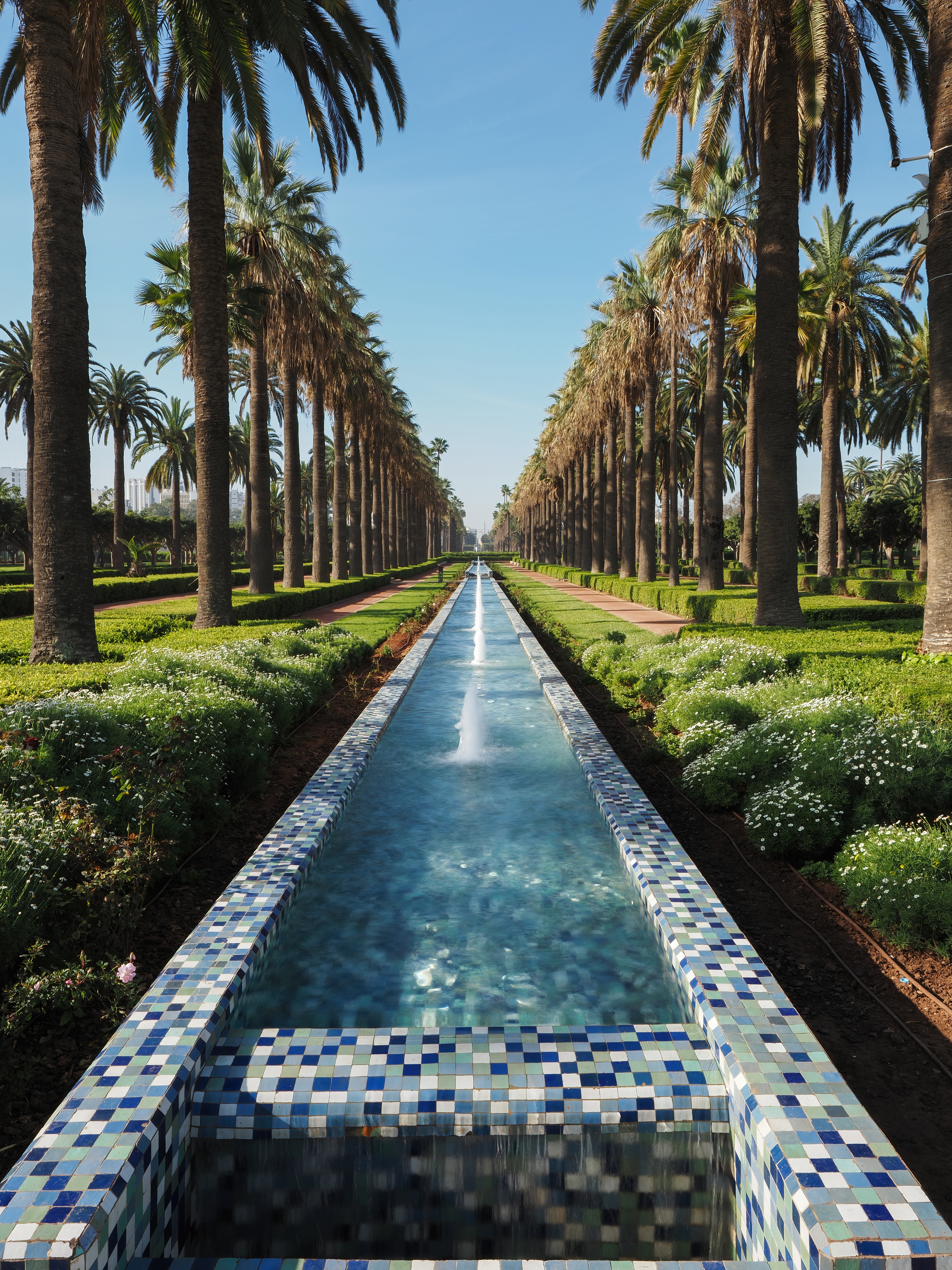
- Interactive map of Arab League Park
- Location: Casablanca, Morocco
- Coordinates: 33°35′19″N 7°37′27″W
- Created: 1913
- Designer: Albert Laprade

The Arab League Park (Arabic: حديقة جامعة الدول العربية, romanized: Ḥadīqat Jāmiʻat al-Duwal al-ʻArabīyah) is an urban park in Casablanca, Morocco. It is located in the center of the city, west of Hassan II Boulevard, east of Roudani Boulevard and Algiers Street, and south east of the Church of the Sacred Heart. The park covers 30 acres of land, and is bisected by Moulay Youssef Boulevard. As of 2019, it remains officially closed to the public after renovations started March 2016, though it was expected to open September 2018.

== History ==
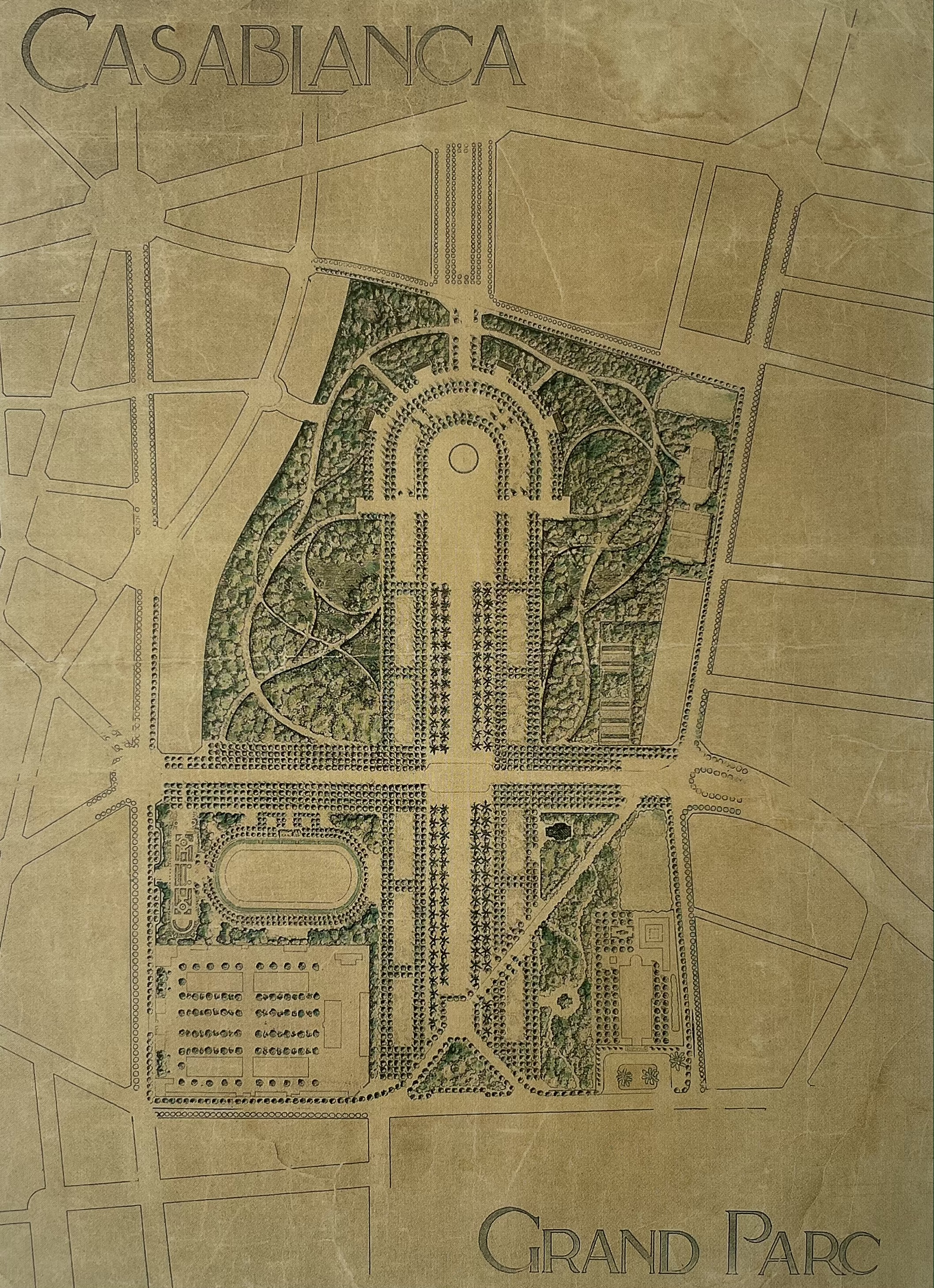
Albert Laprade's general plan for a "Grand Parc," watercolor, 1922

The French architect and urban planner Albert Laprade was appointed to redesign the central park of the city under the supervision of Henri Prost in 1913. It was named Parc Lyautey in honor of Hubert Lyautey, the first French résident général in Morocco.

Lyautey moved some arches from the old Portuguese prison, also known as the Prison of Anfa, east toward what is now Hassan II Boulevard, to decorate the park, serving as a support for a pergola.

Parc Yasmina, an amusement park, was established on Moulay Youssef Boulevard in the 1950s, but it had fallen into disrepair and abandon by the time renovations started.

== Cost of 2016–2019 renovations ==
The cost of the park renovations 2016–present is estimated at 100 million Moroccan dirhams.
