= United Nations Square (Casablanca) =

Square in Casablanca, Morocco

- ساحة الأمم المتحدة
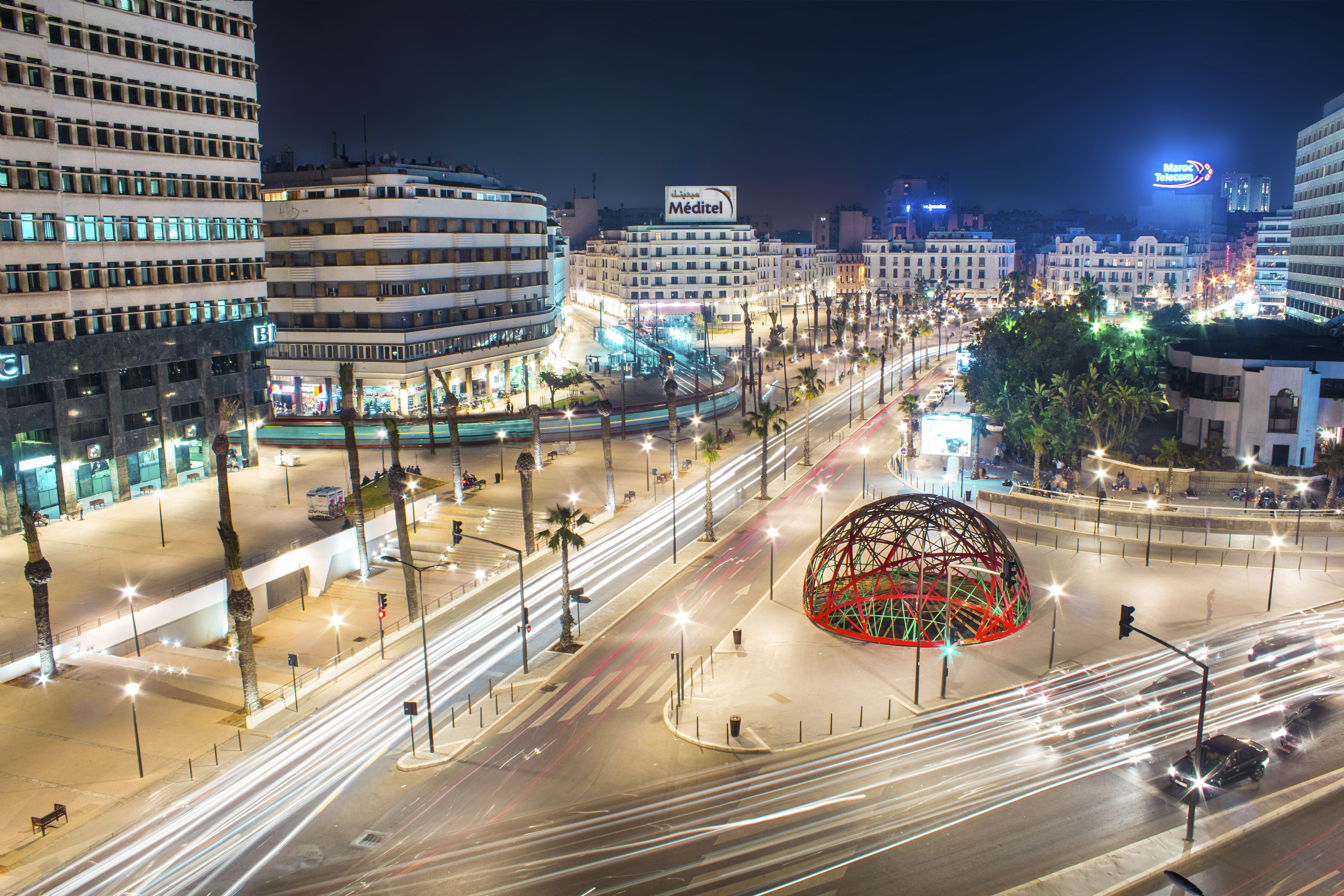
- United Nations Square at night.
- Interactive map of United Nations Square
- Coordinates: 33.5949°N 7.6188°W
- Designer: Henri Prost
- Public transit: Tramway T1

United Nations Square (Arabic: ساحة الأمم المتحدة, romanized: Sāḥat al-Umam al-Muttaḥidah, French: Place des Nations-Unies) is a public square in the center of Casablanca, Morocco. It has been central in the history of Casablanca.

== History ==
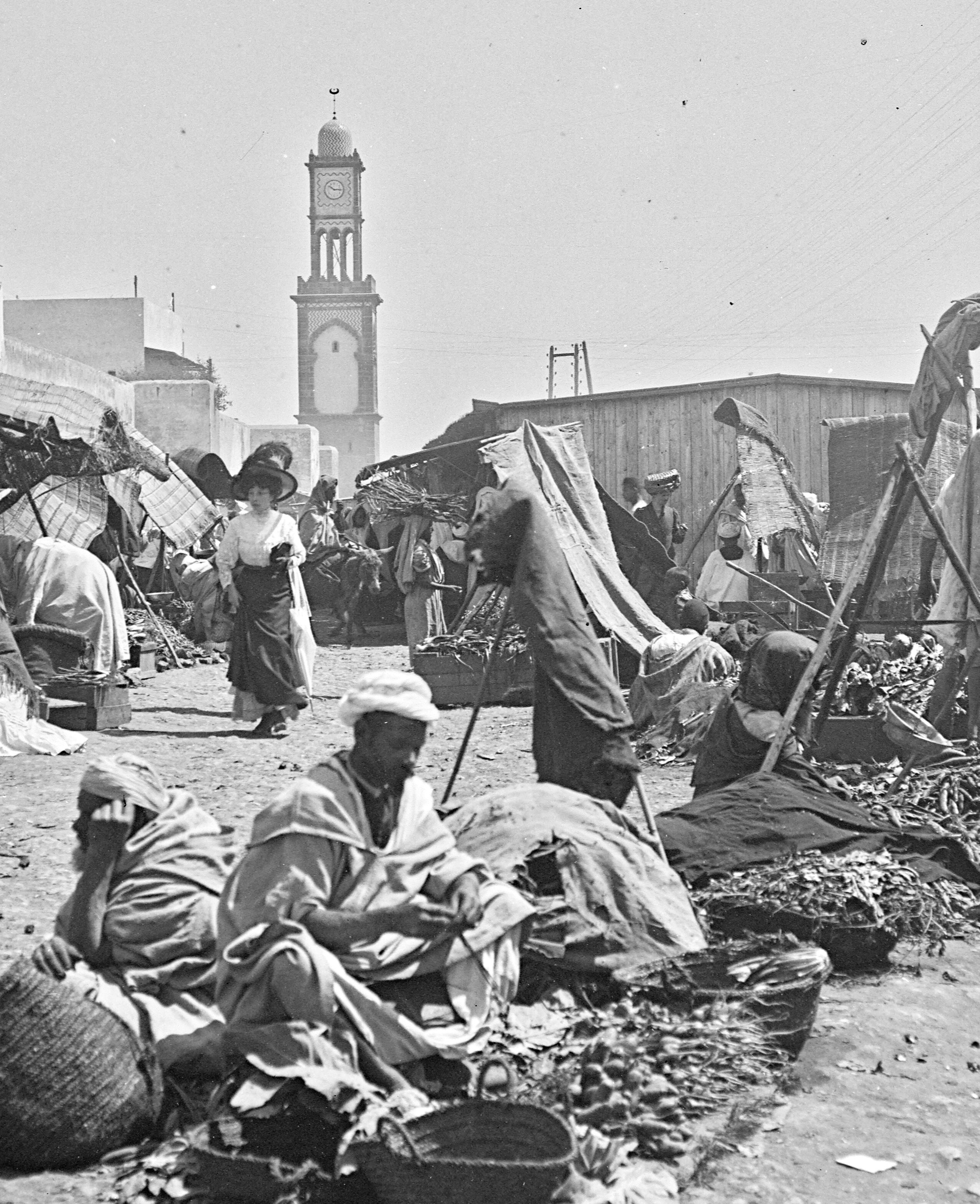
A scene from the soq kbir (السوق الكبير or le Grand Socco, the 'grand market') in 1911, with the recently built Casablanca Clock Tower in the background.

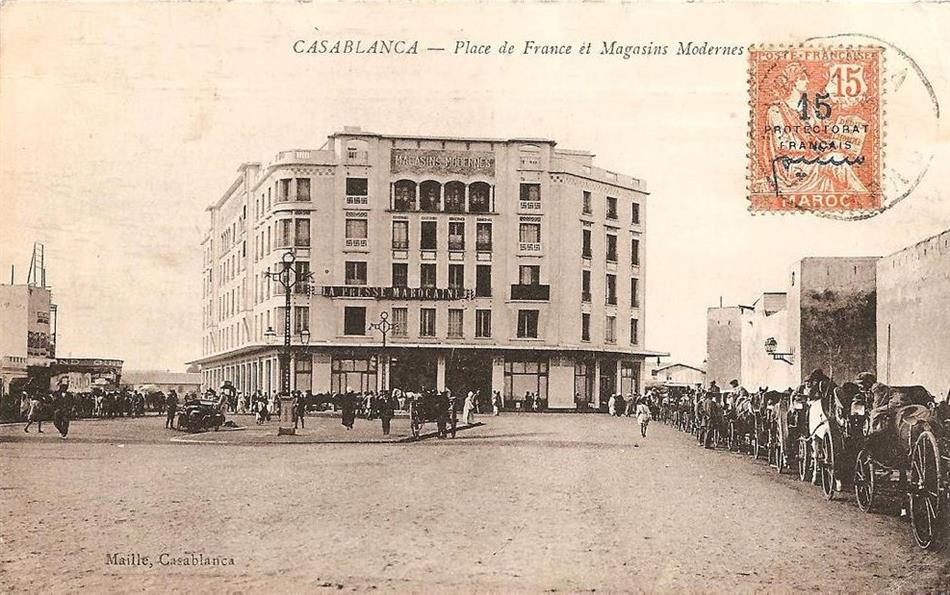
The Magasins Paris-Maroc building, located at the southern end of Place de France, was the first building of the European ville nouvelle.

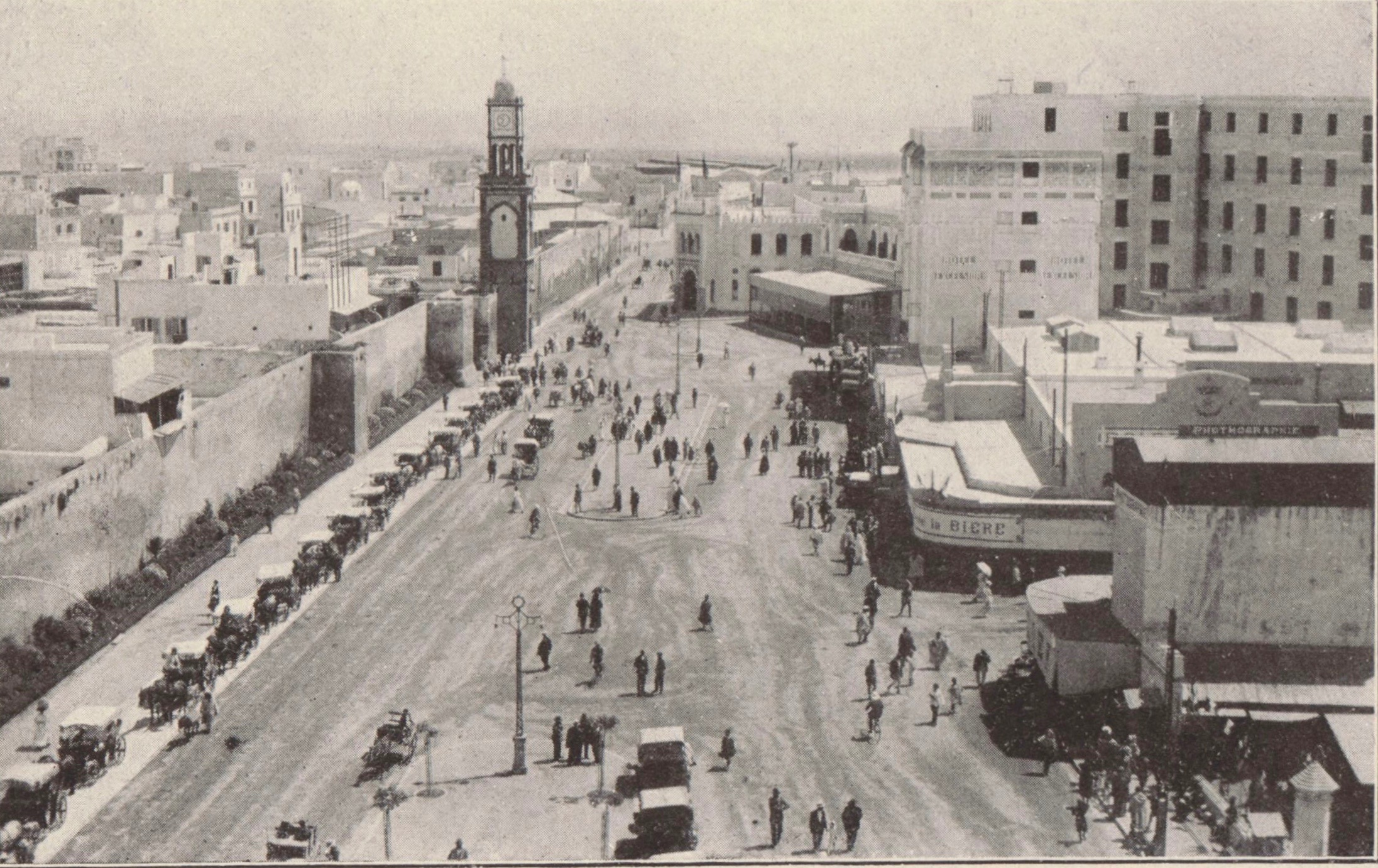
Place de France around 1917, with the clock tower and State Bank of Morocco branch at center

The area outside the walls of the old medina that is now United Nations Square, used to be the location of the Souq Kbir (سوق كبير), also referred to as le Grand Socco, before French colonization. In 1908, after the French bombardment and invasion of Casablanca, the French commander Charles Martial Joseph Dessigny ordered the construction of a clock tower in the area, which then took the name, Place de l'Horloge, "Square of the Clock". The square was then named Place de France, "Square of France," and the surrounding area was developed by a team of French architects and urban planners chosen by the French Résident général Hubert Lyautey and led by Henri Prost.

The Magasins Paris-Maroc building (1914), constructed by Hippolyte Delaporte and Auguste Perret, was located at the southern end of Place de France. in 1915, Hubert Lyautey inaugurated the new Casablanca branch of the State Bank of Morocco was inaugurated on the square's northeastern side. The Neo-Mauresque Hotel Excelsior, which remains today, was built in 1916.

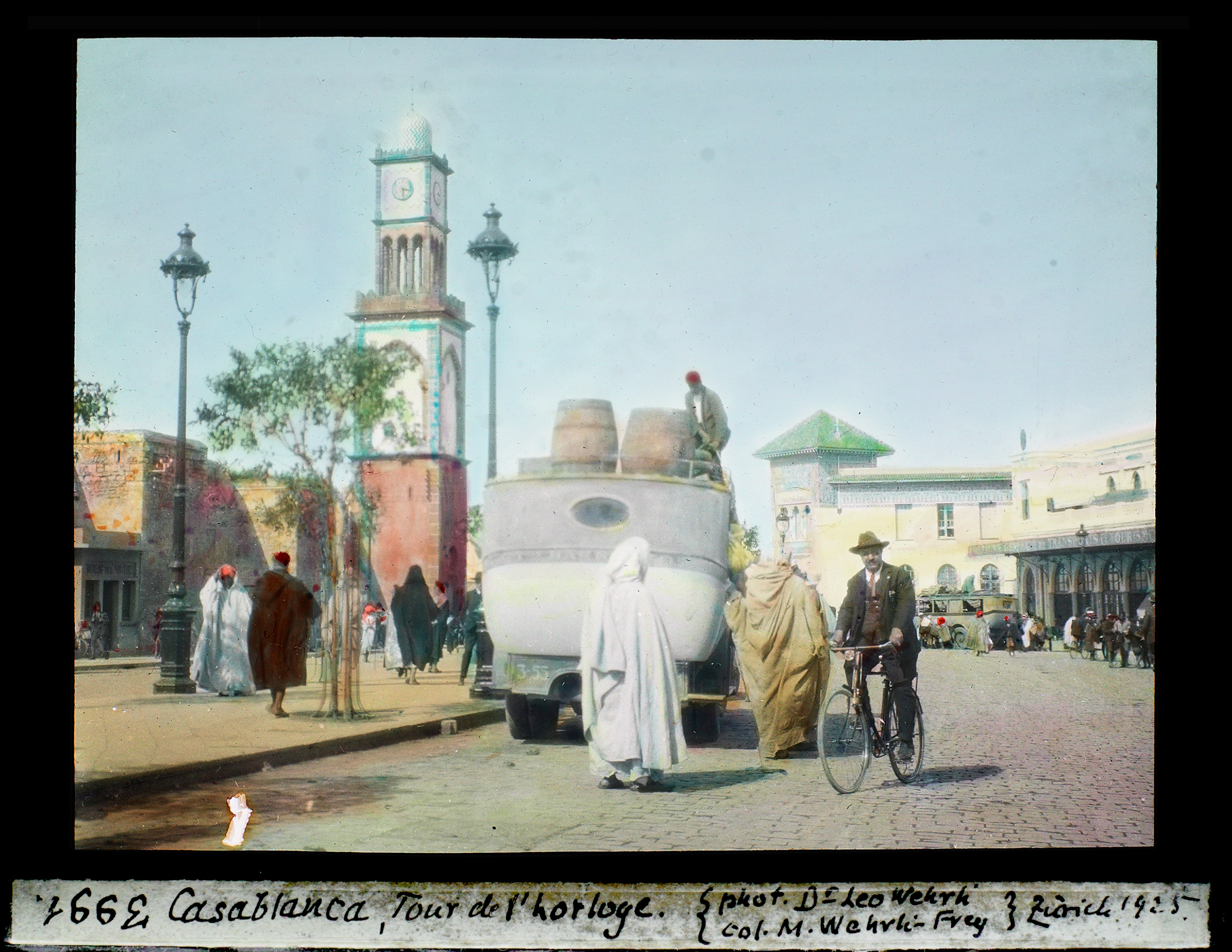
The area around the clock tower in 1925.

As the European ville nouvelle, or "new city," expended eastward of the square, the square evolved from a marketplace to a contact point between the European city and what the French colonists described as the "ville indigène," consisting of the medina and mellah.

As Casablanca developed and expanded, the mellah was repeatedly threatened by colonial architects' plans to expand the Place de France. According to Jean-Louis Cohen, "the square's history can be said to emphasize the ambiguous and ever-changing attitude of the Protectorate with respect to the Jewish community."

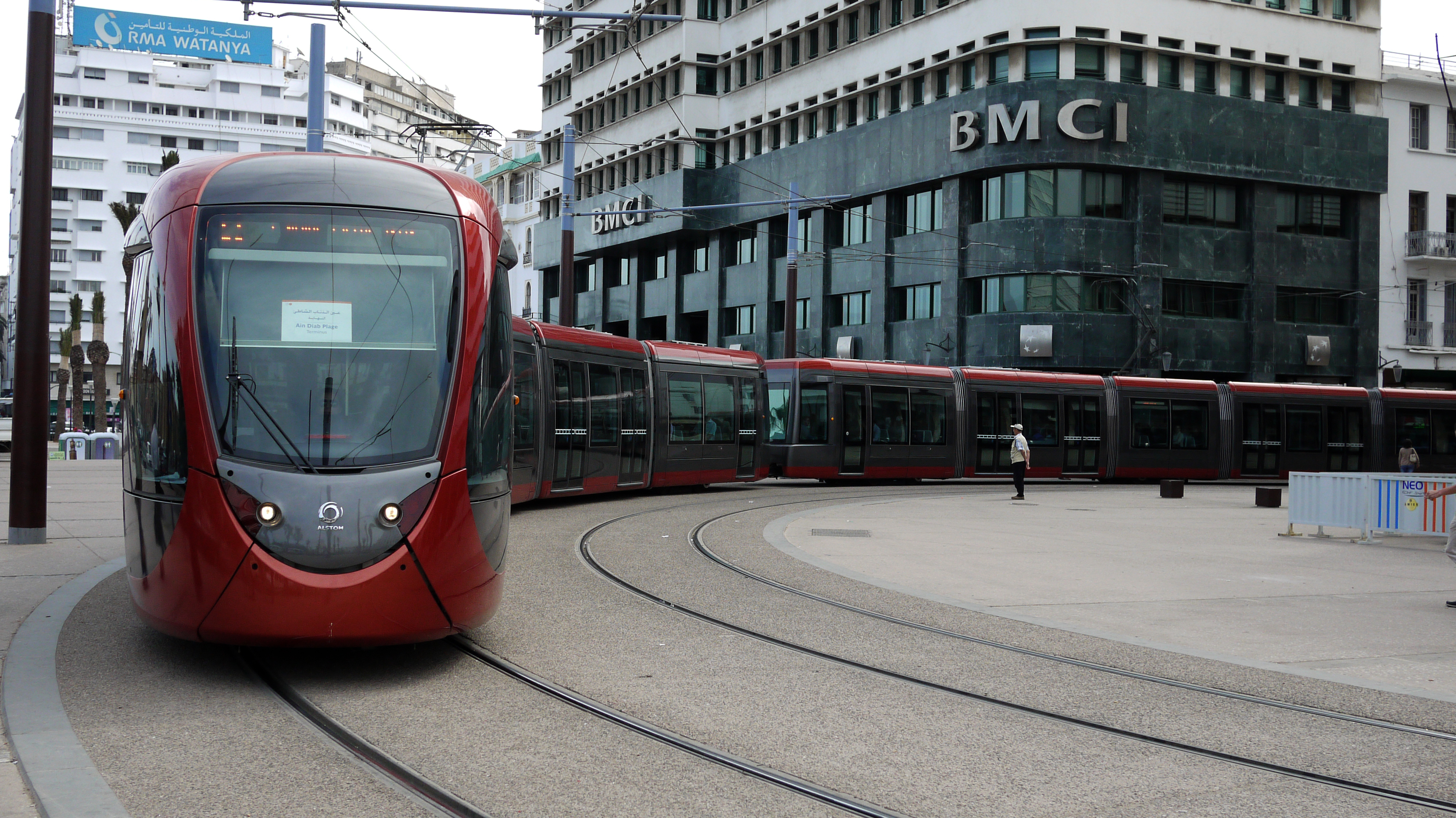
The Tramway winds in front of the BMCI building, through United Nations Square.

The clock tower was demolished in 1948, together with several of the square's buildings that stood on the way of the Avenue des Forces Armées Royales, created under the new urban planning proposed by Michel Écochard. The square became a bus station for a period of time in the midcentury. A clock tower imitating the original's design was constructed a short distance closer to the medina in 1993.

The architect Jean-François Zevaco designed the Kora Ardia (كرة أرضية), "Globe," in 1975.

The Casablanca Tramway transformed the square. Work started in 2009, and the first line was inaugurated December 12, 2012.

== Access ==
The square is reachable by Line 1 of the Tramway, which stops at United Nations Square Station.

== See also ==
- Casablanca Clock Tower
