= Hippolyte Delaporte =

French architect

- Born: October 14, 1875; Versailles
- Died: March 8, 1962 (aged 87); Marseille
- Occupation: architect
- Notable work: Hôtel Excelsior, Maret Building

Hippolyte-Joseph Delaporte was a French architect active in Morocco during the French Protectorate. He designed several buildings from the 1920s up to the 1950s, mainly in Casablanca. In 1952, he was in charge of architectural planning of the city.

== Biography ==
Delaporte was born in Versailles and, after having spent most of his life in colonial Morocco, died in Marseille. In 1895, he was admitted to the École nationale supérieure des beaux-arts (ENSBA) and studied under Victor Laloux in his atelier. He received his diploma in 1902. From 1913 on, he worked as architect in Casablanca and Rabat. Several of his buildings were since destroyed, but a large number also have survived and have been restored as part of the architectural heritage of Morocco.

His 1920 building in Rabat on the Al Joulan Square next to the city's Saint Peter's Cathedral, known as the Gourmet Building first occupied apartments and a bakery with an adjoining café on the ground floor. During World War II, it was transformed into the Saint Peter's clinic. After Moroccan independence in 1956, the building was again used for private accommodation and, later, as office space. In 2001, the city council of Rabat decided to renovate this historical building, and two more floors were added in the same Art Nouveau style as the original three floors.

== Projects ==
- Magasins Paris-Maroc, Place de France, 1913-14 (concrete engineering and execution Perret Frères).
- Hôtel Excelsior, Place de France, 1914-16 (reinforced concrete engineering by Coignet).
- Villa, Boulevard d'Anfa, 1917.
- Magasins Paris-Maroc Annex, 1920, Rue Chevandier de Valdrôme, 1920 (with Perret Frères).
- Temporary theater, Boulevard de Paris, 1922.
- Architect's villa, Rue du Parc, ca. 1924.
- Robelin building, Boulevard d'Alsace, 1928.
- Villa du Garreau, corner of Avenue Mers-Sultan and Rue du Languedoc, 1929.
- Lebascle mansion, Boulevard Gouraud, 1929.
- Ferrieu house, 10, Rue du Parc, 1932.
- Fouronge house, 5 Rue Defly Dieudé, 1932.
- Cannestraro building, corner of Boulevard des Régiments coloniaux and Rue des Colonies, 1932.
- Maret building, 128 Boulevard de la Gare, 1932.
- Oil and soap factories, Route de Rabat, 1937.
- "Gourmet building", Rabat, 1930s
- Villa Merlin, Rue des Aviateurs, 1937.
- Villa Louradour, Val Fleuri, 1952.

== See also ==
- Casamémoire
