= Hôtel Excelsior =

Hotel in Casablanca, Morocco

Hotel Excelsior
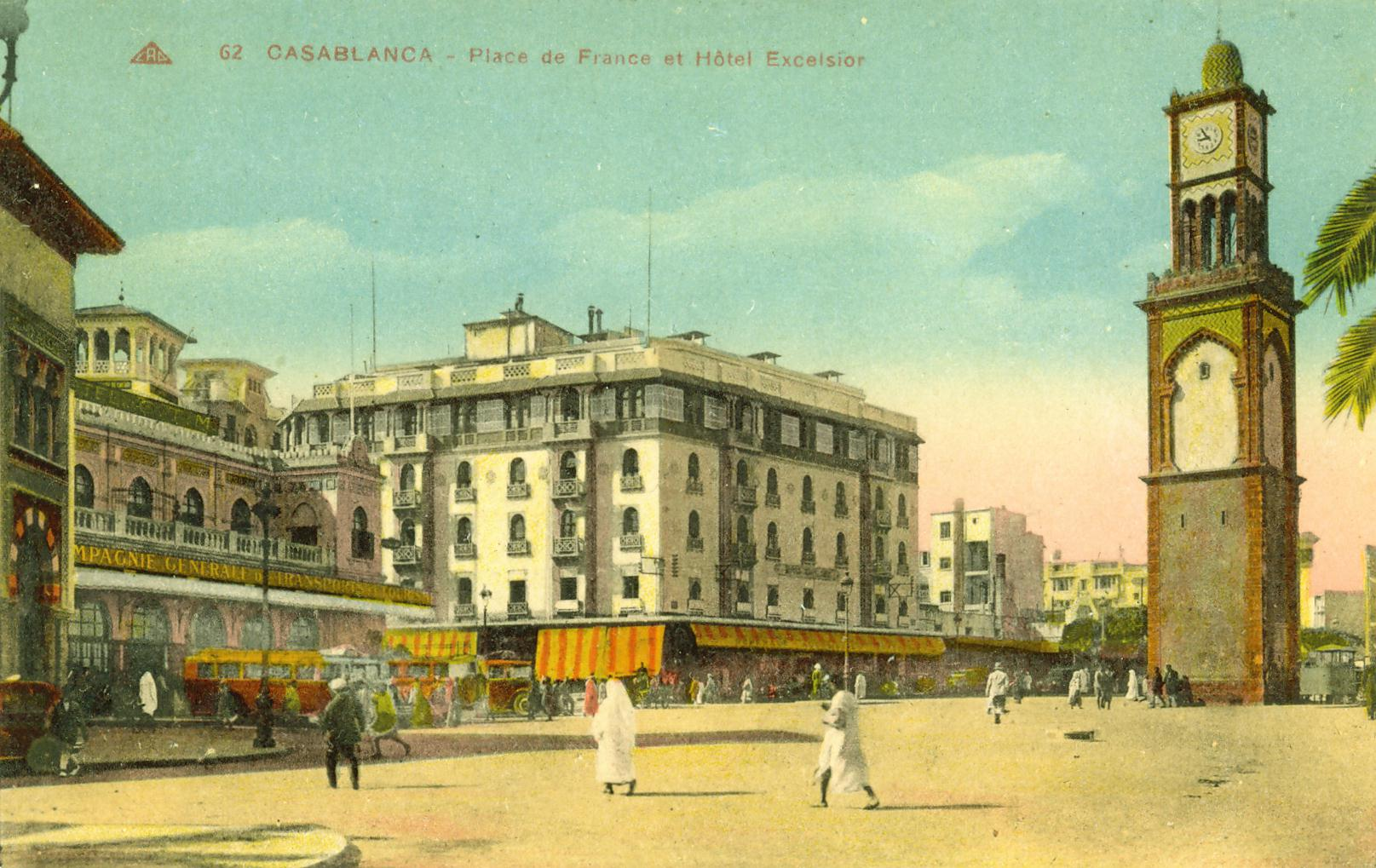
- Interactive map of the Hotel Excelsior area

General information
- Location: Casablanca, Morocco
- Coordinates: 33.5962°N 7.6164°W

Design and construction
- Architect: Hippolyte Delaporte

The Hôtel Excelsior or Excelsior Hotel is a hotel constructed 1914–1916 by Hippolyte Delaporte in Casablanca, Morocco. Along with the department store Magasins Paris-Maroc, it is one of the architect's first works in the city. The hotel is located at United Nations Square, called the Place de France during the French Protectorate at the time the hotel was built.

== History ==
In 1901, Casablanca had three hotels. By 1911, after the French occupation of Casablanca, the French Commandant Charles Martial Joseph Dessigny counted six or seven hotels and four or five European restaurants, noting that "a hotel equipped with modern comforts is desirable and would be assured of a good clientele." The Excelsior satisfied the plans of the commandant, who in July 1908 had been put in charge of a public facilities department established by the French authorities.

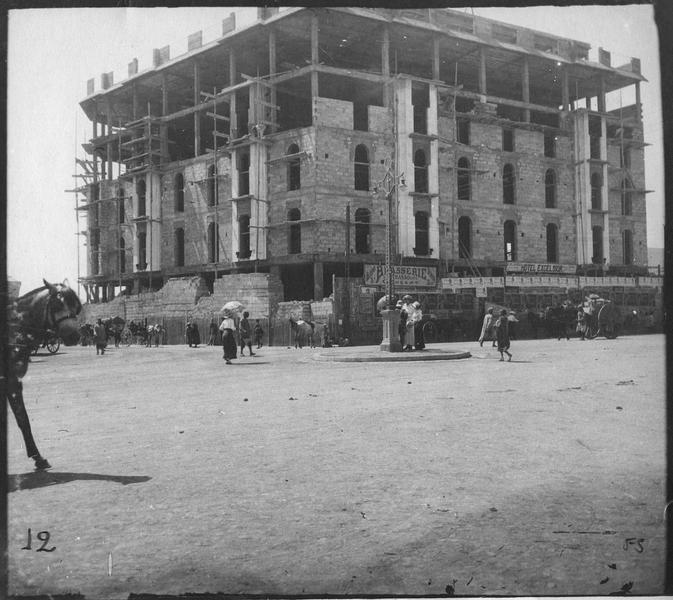
The Excelsior Hotel under construction in 1916.

The Excelsior Hotel was built on the site of what had been a slaughterhouse. First imagined as six-story buildings, the hotel and its neighbor Magasins Paris-Maroc represented a departure from the adjacent medina in terms of scale.

The Excelsior served an emerging segment of the population of Casablanca, offering modern comforts to the Western businessmen coming and going. The Excelsior and its brasserie quickly replaced the Café du Commerce as the meeting place for business and land speculation deals.

Henry Dugard in Le Maroc Au Lendemain De La Guerre wrote that it represented the transformation of Casablanca from a "a rough and unrefined monster" into a civilized city.

== Architecture ==
The building had a frame of concrete and friezes and balconies with inspiration taken from neo-mauresque decorative themes then popular in Algeria and Tunisia, also occupied by the French.

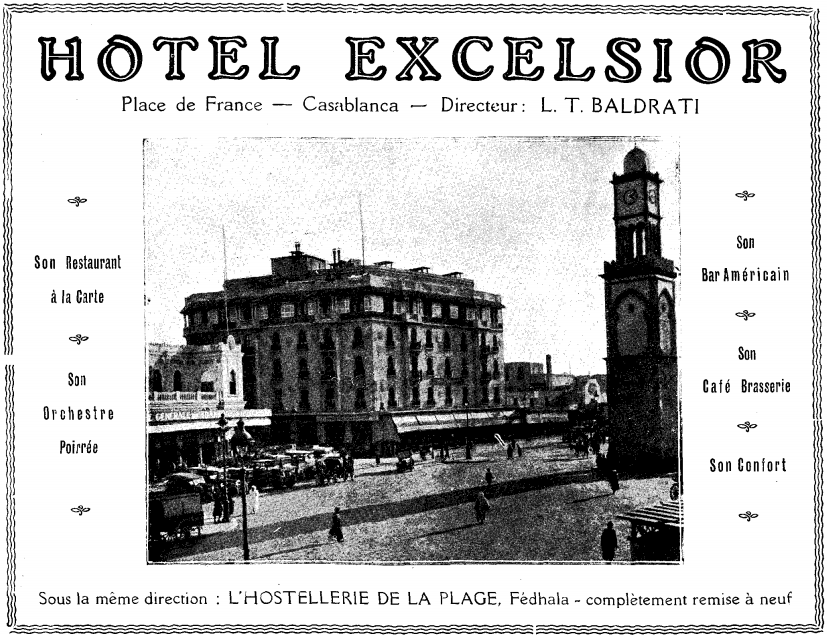
Advertisement for Hotel Excelsior published in l'Avenir illustré.
