= Medina of Casablanca =

Historical quarter in Casablanca, Morocco

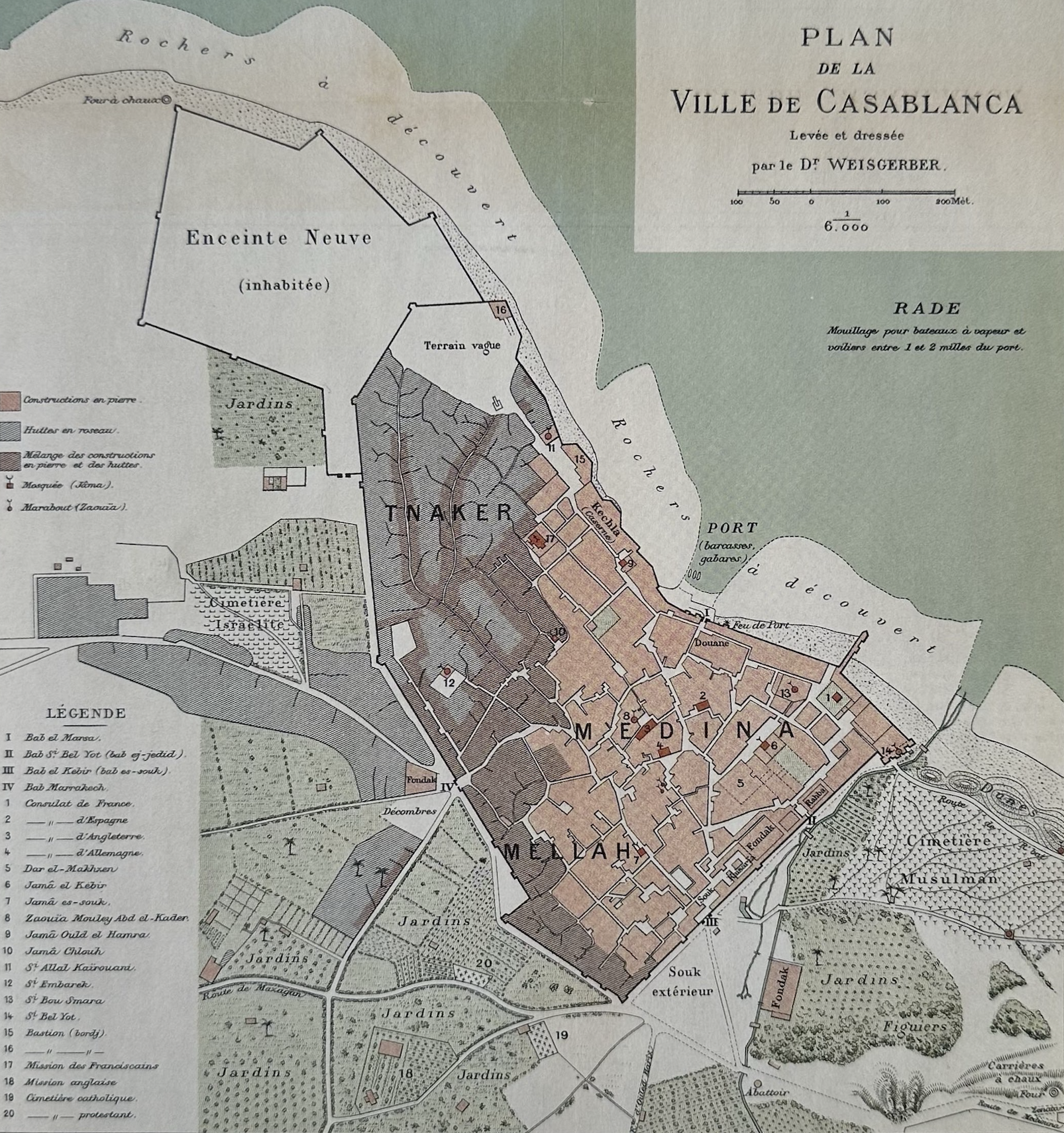
In 1900, Casablanca consisted of its Medina, including the Mellah and the Tnaker.

The Medina of Casablanca, sometimes the Old Medina (Arabic: المدينة القديمة or المدينة العتيقة; French: Ancienne Médina), is the historic center of the city.

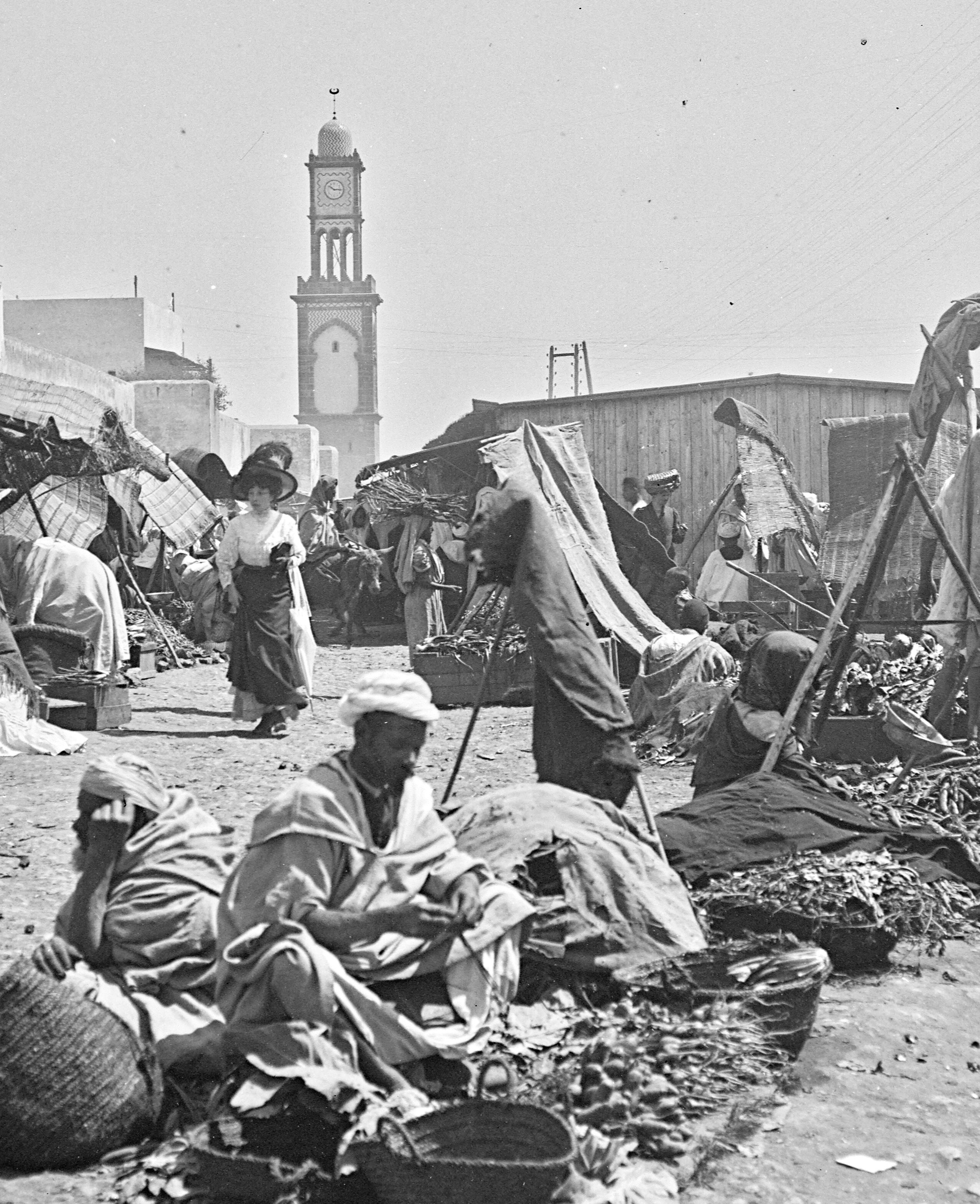
A view of the soq kbir (السوق الكبير or le Grand Socco, the 'grand market') located outside the eastern wall of the Medina, 1911. The recently built Clock Tower is in the background.

After the city of Anfa (meaning: "hill" in English) was destroyed in the earthquake of 1755, Sultan Mohammed ben Abdallah rebuilt the city and constructed the port. He named the city "ad-Dār al-Bayḍāʾ" (Arabic: الدار البيضاء, lit. 'White house').

At the turn of the 20th century, Casablanca consisted of the walled Medina, including the subdivisions of the Mellah, inhabited by the Jewish community in Casablanca, and the Tnaker, a semi-rural neighborhood for migrants arriving from the countryside. The Medina proper referred especially to the eastern portion of the walled city, containing Dār el-Makhzen, site of the tribunal and residence of the governor who represented the Makhzen; the Dar al-Makhzen Mosque; the custom house; residences of functionaries and wealthy Muslim merchants; and European consulates and residences.

The Medina had the shape of an irregular polygon with a maximum length of about 1,000 meters and an average width of about 500 meters, covering a territory of about 60 hectares. Sultan Hassan I (r. 1873–94) built an enclosure to the northwest, Sur ej-Jdid, to house Europeans, who refused to be confined to the space. The ramparts of the Medina had three main gates: Bab el-Mersa on the northeastern wall, facing the harbor; Bab es-Souk (also known as Bab el-Kebir) to the east, facing the soq kbir or Grand Market; and Bab Marrakesh to the south, where merchants arriving from the direction of Marrakesh entered the city.

French forces bombarded and occupied the city in 1907.

A number of examples of Moorish architecture were built in the Medina. There are a number of aḍriħa (mausolea) including those of Sidi Allal al-Qairawani, Sidi Bousmara, and Sidi Belyout. Casablanca was one of a number of cities—including Essaouira, Marrakesh, and Rabat—that were revitalized after the earthquake of 1755, by Sultan Mohammed ben Abdallah—whom Abdallah Laroui called "the architect of modern Morocco." The sultan was known to have used European architects, such as Théodore Cornut and Ahmed el Inglizi, in his projects. The Sqala bastion and the two oldest mosques in the city, the Mosque of the Makhzen and the Ould el-Hamra Mosque, were built during Sultan Muhammad Ben Abdallah's renovations to the city. Later mosques built in the Medina were the Souq Mosque and the Shleuh Mosque.

Spanish Franciscans built the Church of San Buenaventura (now the Buenaventura Cultural Center) in 1890.

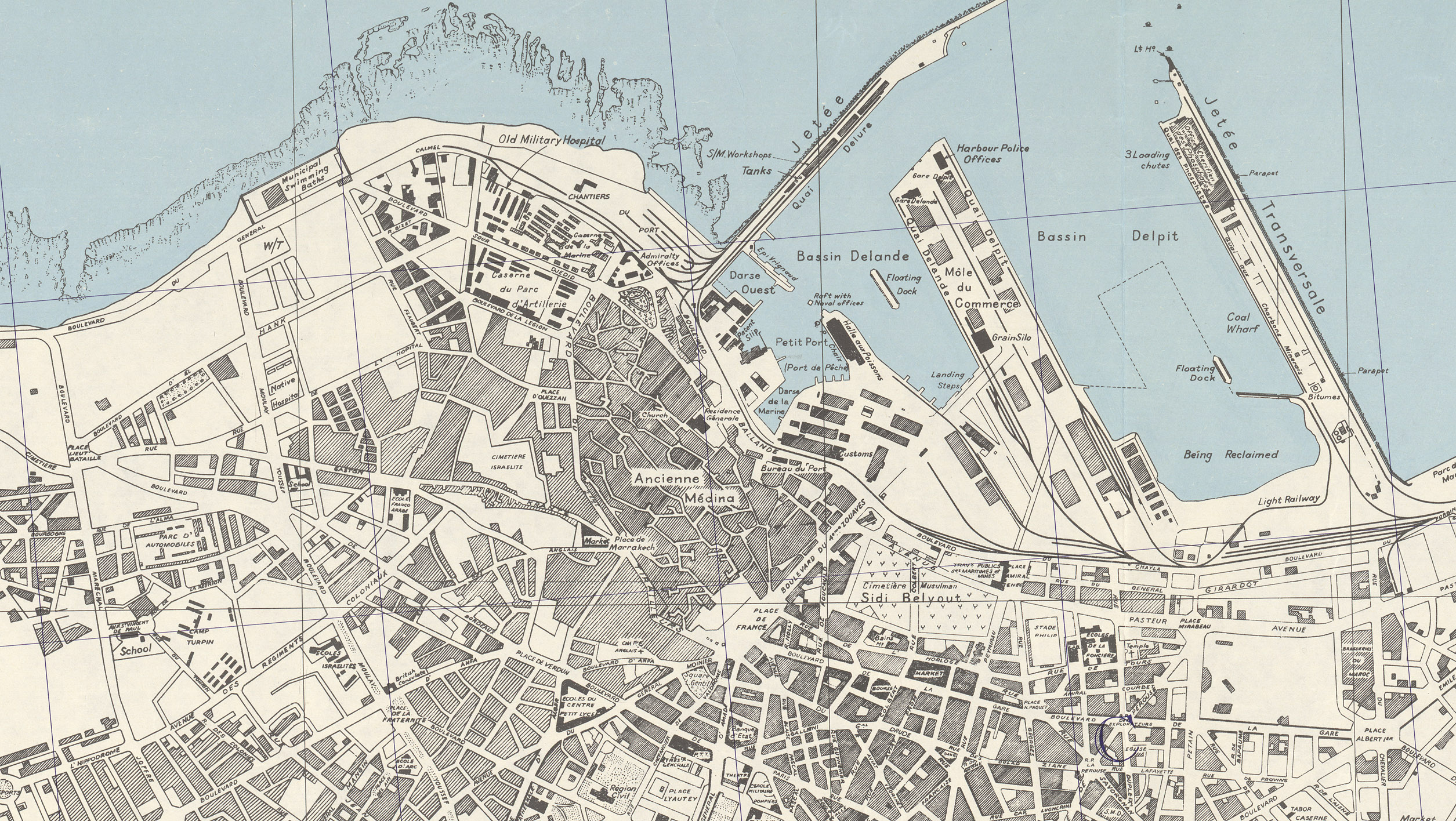
The ancienne médina in a 1942 map prepared by the US army in its occupation of Morocco in World War II.

With the construction of Mahkamat al-Pasha in 1941, the Muslim judiciary moved from Dar al-Makhzen in the Medina to the Hubous, a neighborhood constructed as a nouvelle ville indigène under the auspices of the colonial regime. The move, completed in 1949, consolidated the status of the Hubous as the new center of Muslim Casablanca.

In the later period of the protectorate, the Medina, along with the New Medina (The Hubous), Ben M'Sik, and Carrières Centrales formed the core of Casablanca's popular Muslim neighborhoods and therefore neighborhoods of anti-colonial resistance activity.

== Mellah ==
The Mellah, the Jewish quarter, was located in the southern part of the Medina, between Bab es-Souq and Bab Marrakesh. Unlike older mellah quarters in other cities, the Mellah of Casablanca was not separated from the rest of the Medina by a wall or a gate, and there was an area at the periphery between the two quarters inhabited by both Jews and Muslims. The street called Rue des Synagogues also had mosques and zawiyas.

== Tnaker ==
The Tnaker (Arabic: التناكر, plural of tenkīra تنكيرة 'tent' or 'hut', a word that was used in Doukkala) neighborhood to the northwest was a semi-rural area containing tents and sparse construction, a prefiguration of later shanty towns, inhabited by peasant migrants attracted by commercial activity in the city. In this northwest direction, the Medina opened gave way to the tents which gave way to vacant space, later made into a public park. The main mosque of the Tnaker was the Shleuh Mosque, built in 1899/1900 (1317 of the Hijra) by Muhammad as-Sanhãji of the Sous and named in honor of the descendants of the Haha brought to the city by Sultan Mohammed ben Abdallah.
