= Mausoleum of Allal al-Qairawani =

Building in Casablanca, Morocco

- ضريح السيد علال القيرواني
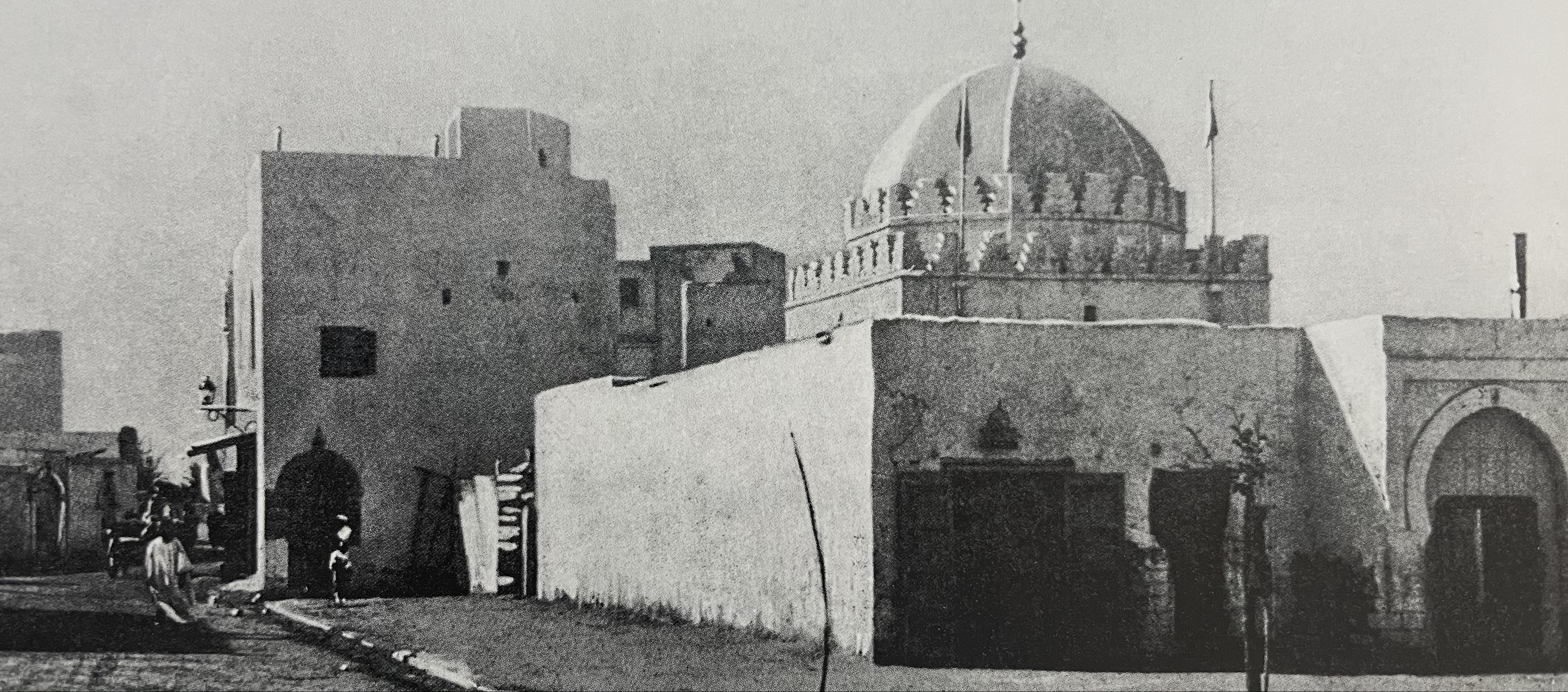
- The Mausoleum of Allal al-Qairawani in 1915.
- Interactive map of the Mausoleum of Allal al-Qairawani area

General information
- Coordinates: 33°36′12″N 7°37′11″W

The Mausoleum of Allal al-Qairawani (Arabic: ضريح السيد علال القيرواني) is a darīh, zawiya, and ribat dedicated to Allal al-Qairawani, located in the Medina of Casablanca, Morocco.

The mausoleum became a destination for fishermen.

== History ==
Legend tells that Allal al-Qairawani was a trader who came from Qairawan to Anfa (Casablanca) around 1350 during the reign of the Marinid Sultan Abu al-Hasan Ali ibn Othman and settled to do business along with his wife or daughter "Lalla Baida" (White Lady). The Mausoleum of Allal al-Qairawani is considered the oldest of the zawiyas of Casablanca, as those such as that of Sidi Belyout are much more recent.

The Mausoleum of Allal al-Qairawani was renovated in 2016, after which King Muhammad VI made a visit.

== Architecture ==
The mausoleum's architectural style is typical of traditional Moroccan architecture.
