= Dar al-Makhzen Mosque =

Mosque in Casablanca, Morocco

Coordinates: 33°35′54″N 7°37′00″W

Dar al-Makhzen Mosque (Arabic: مسجد دار المخزن, romanized: Masjid Dār al-Makhzen, also known as the مسجد المخزن 'Makhzen mosque' or المسجد العتيق 'the ancient mosque'; built 1786–87) is the oldest standing mosque in Casablanca, Morocco. It is located in the old Medina of Casablanca in the arrondissement Sidi Belyout.

== Names ==
According to Othmane El Achari, the mosque was originally called the mosque of Sultan Muḥammad III b. ʿAbd Allāh (مسجد السلطان محمد الثالث ابن عبد الله), then as the Great Mosque (المسجد الكبير) as it was the largest mosque in the port city. It was then called Dar al-Makhzen Mosque for the neighboring Makhzen building, which later became the shrine of Sidi Bousmara. According to Mustapha Naciri, the Makhzen building was originally a mahkama in which a group of quḍāt who would adjudicate general and social cases.

== History ==
The mosque was built in 1786–87 (1201 Hijri) in the rule of Sultan Muḥammad III b. ʿAbd Allāh (1757–1790), who rebuilt Casablanca after the earthquake of 1755 and constructed its port. In 1786, the Spanish consul remarked that it as a "good" mosque in a letter to Count Floridablanca describing the "sizable construction works" underway in the city.

It was expanded under Sultan Hassan I (r. 1873–1894).

It was renovated under King Muhammad V.
