= Maret Building =

Building in Casablanca, Morocco

Coordinates: 33.593879°N 7.609607°W

- Immeuble Maret
- The Maret Building on Muhammad V Boulevard under the rain.
- Interactive map of the Maret Building area

General information
- Architectural style: Neo Mauresque; Neoclassical; Modernist
- Location: 128 Muhammad V Boulevard, Casablanca, Morocco
- Inaugurated: 1932

Design and construction
- Architect: Hippolyte Delaporte

The Maret Building (French: Immeuble Maret) is located at 128 Muhammad V Boulevard in downtown Casablanca, Morocco. It was designed by Hippolyte Joseph Delaporte and built in 1932, during the French protectorate. Its architecture is a prominent example of the fusion of Neo-Mauresque and Neoclassical architecture with Art Deco touches. The Maret Building features a colorful zellij-covered dome.

== Architecture ==
The Maret Building has 7 floors including a ground floor. Its architectural style is a fusion of Neo Mauresque (Moorish Revival), Neoclassical, and Modern architecture. A series of horizontal wavelike concrete curves spread out across the main façade from the rounded corner of the building. On the 6th floor, there is an arcade that gives contrastive emphasis to the floor below, which is partly covered with Moroccan zellij ceramic tiles. The tiles are multicolored, but the predominant color is turquoise; it is reminiscent of Antoni Gaudí's work. The corner of the building is crowned with a zellij-covered dome.
