= Ould el-Hamra Mosque =

Mosque in Casablanca, Morocco

- مسجد ولد الحمرا
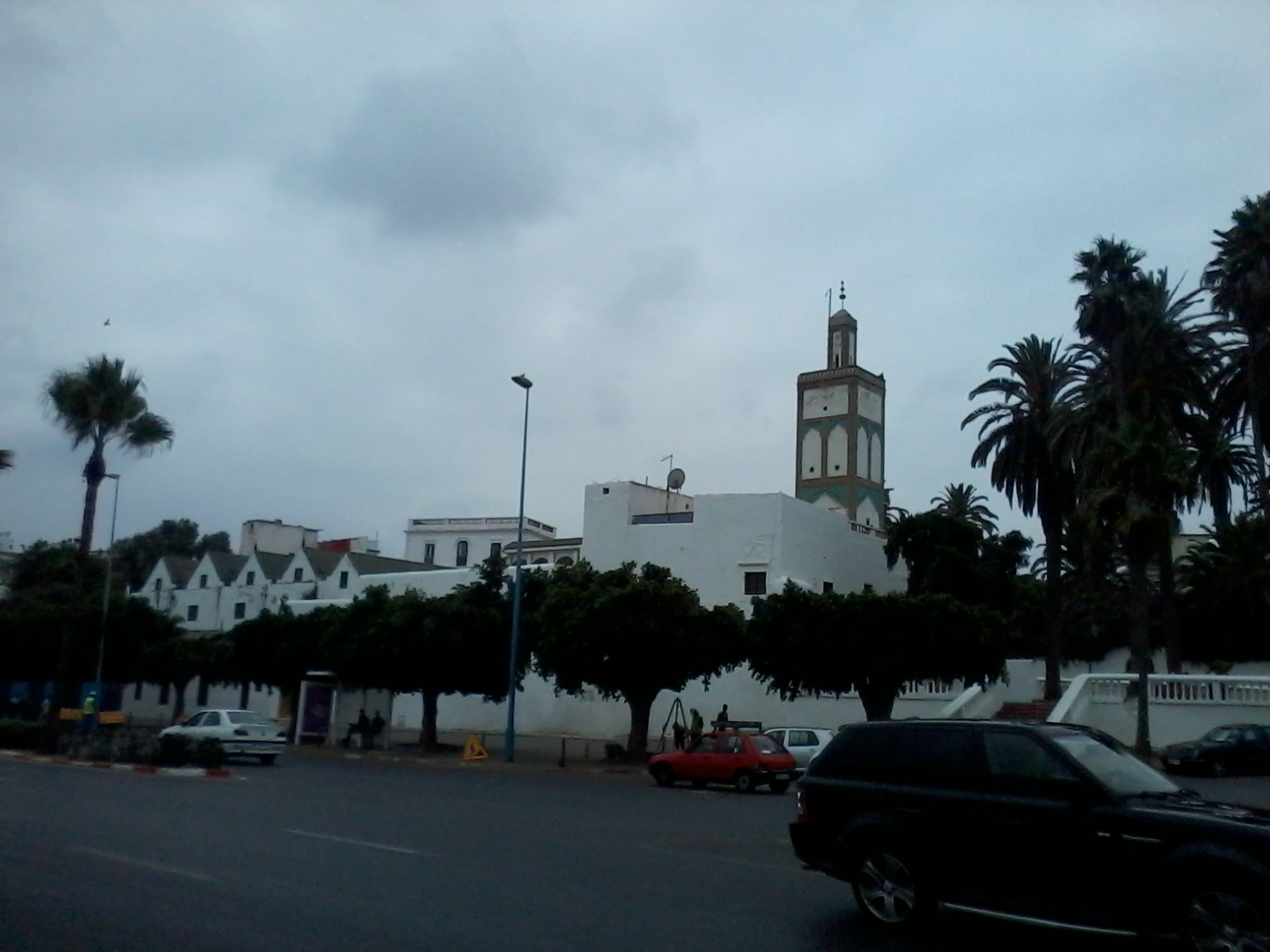

- Location within Morocco

Religion
- Affiliation: Islam

Location
- Municipality: Casablanca
- Country: Morocco
- Interactive map of Ould el-Hamra Mosque
- Coordinates: 33°36′05″N 7°37′06″W

Architecture
- Type: mosque
- Style: Moorish
- Established: 1789

Specifications
- Capacity: 1,500 worshippers
- Site area: 250 m^{2}

Ould el-Hamra Mosque (Arabic: مسجد ولد الحمرا) is a mosque in the medina of Casablanca first erected in 1789. Along with the Ettedgui Synagogue and the Church of San Buenaventura, it is of the three buildings representing the three Abrahamic religions in a space of 250 m^{2} in the medina.

== History ==
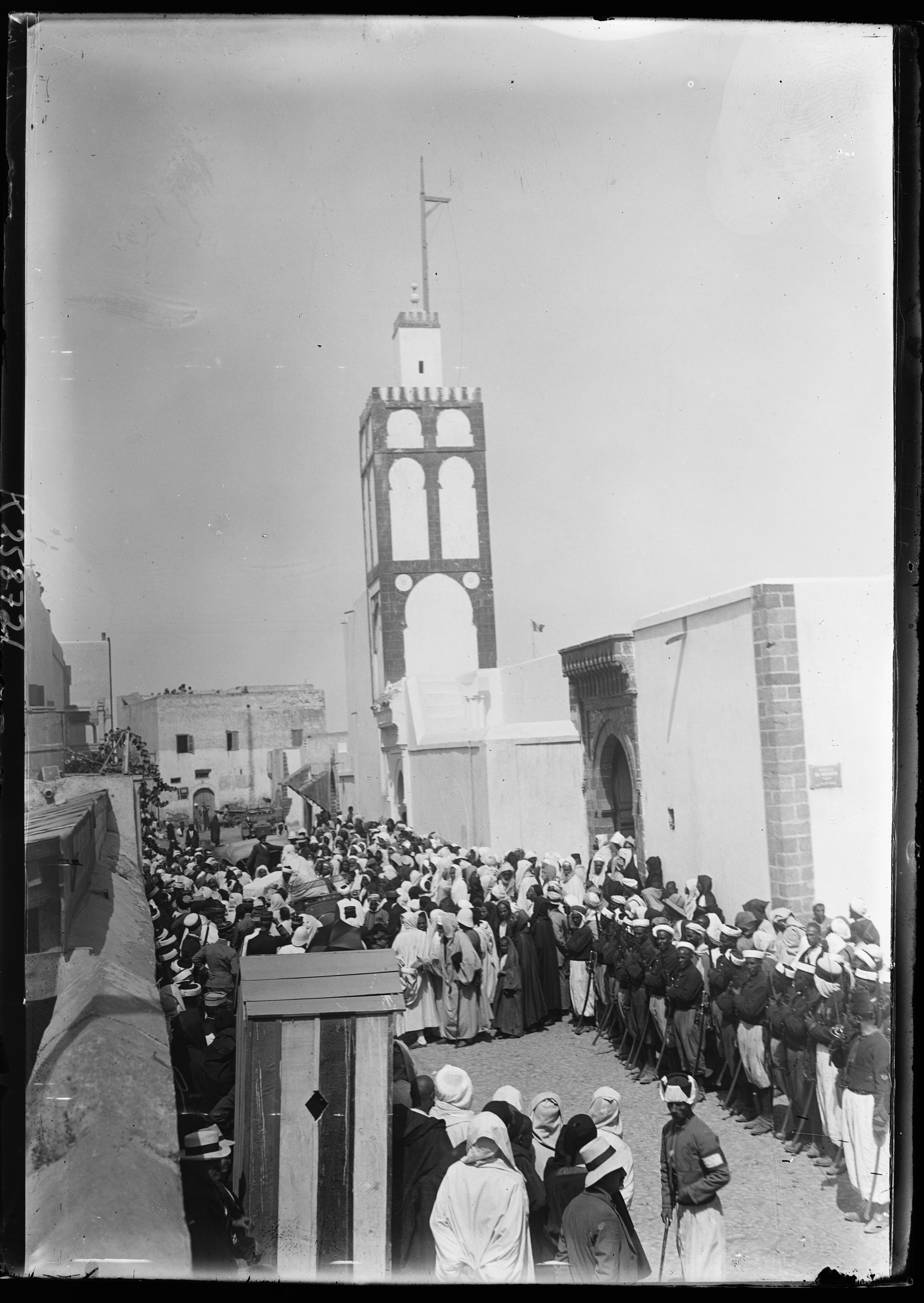
A crowd around an automobile outside the south wall of the mosque in 1913.

It was erected under Sultan Muhammad III bin Abdellah in the year 1204 of the Hijra, or 1789. Casablanca was one of a number of cities—including Essaouira, Marrakesh, and Rabat—that Sultan Muhammad III revitalized after the earthquake of 1755. The historian Abdallah Laroui called the sultan "the architect of modern Morocco."

It underwent renovations under Sultan Hassan I in the year 1320 of the Hijra, or 1892.

It underwent restoration work supervised by the Ministry of Islamic Affairs starting May 14, 2010. King Mohammed VI inaugurated the mosque after the restoration with a Friday sermon December 16, 2016.

== Architecture ==
The architecture of the mosque is Maghrebi. The prayer hall can fit 1500 people.
