= Church of San Buenaventura =

Former Catholic church in Casablanca, Morocco

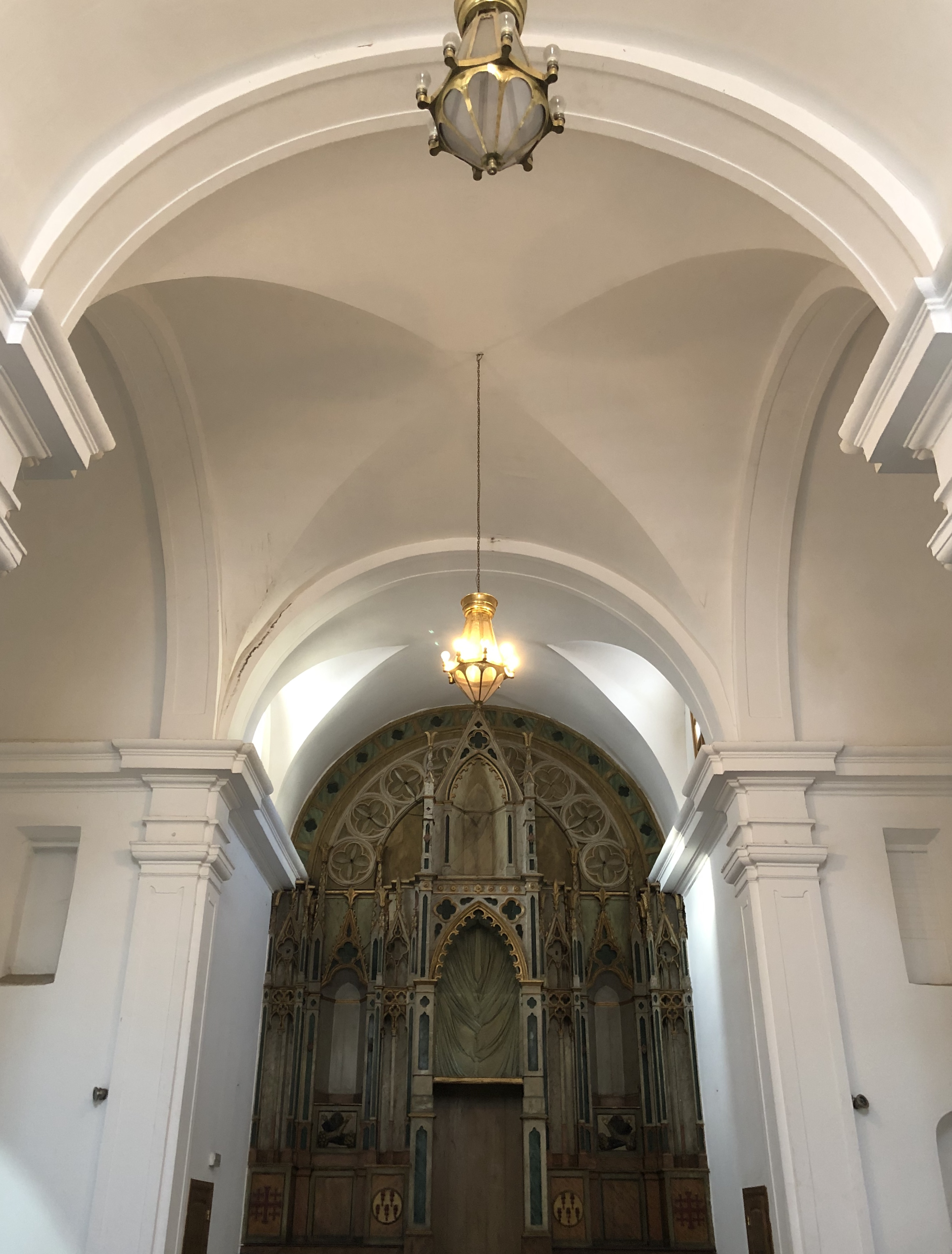
- Nave of the former church in 2020

- Location of the former church in Morocco
- Church of San Buenaventura
- 33°36′06″N 7°37′12″W
- Address: Tangier Street, Casablanca
- Country: Morocco
- Denomination: Catholicism (former)
- Religious institute: Franciscans

History
- Status: Church (1890–1968)
- Dedication: Saint Buenaventura

Architecture
- Architectural type: Church
- Completed: 1890

The Church of San Buenaventura is a former Roman Catholic church, located in the Medina of Casablanca, Morocco. The church was founded by Franciscans in c. 1890. Built on territory Sultan Hassan I of Morocco granted to King Alfonso XII, it was the seat of the Spanish church in Casablanca from the late 19th century.

It ceased to operate as a church in 1968, after which it hosted families in need. The Spanish Embassy ceded the property to the city of Casablanca. Around 2016, the 1,250-square-metre (13,500 sq ft) site was transformed into a cultural center serving the community of the Medina.

== See also ==
- List of churches in Morocco
- Catholic Church in Morocco
