= Casamémoire =

Moroccan non-profit organization

- ذاكرة الدار البيضاء
- Formation: 1995; 31 years ago
- Location(s): 29 Avenue Lalla Yacout; Casablanca 20250
- Coordinates: 33.591605°N 7.614440°W
- President: Rabia El Ridaoui
- Website: casamemoire.org

Casamémoire (Arabic: ذاكرة الدار البيضاء) is a non-profit organization dedicated to the promotion and protection of the 20th-century architecture of Casablanca, Morocco. As of 2015, Casamemoire is an NGO in an official partnership with UNESCO with consultative status.

Jacqueline Alluchon established the organization in 1995 in the aftermath of the destruction of Marius Boyer's Villa Moqri, amid general disinterest among the city's decision-makers. Its objectives are to raise awareness in public opinion and among the city's social and political decision-makers, as well as give value to the city's architectural heritage through the restoration and rehabilitation of historical buildings.

Casamemoire registered its first building, Hotel Lincoln, as architectural heritage in 2000.

Since 2009, Casamémoire has organized Casablanca's Heritage Days (أيام التراث, Journées du Patrimoine): 3 days per year during which volunteer guides offer free guided visits of the city's architecture. The Heritage Days allow the public to discover the architectural treasures of Morocco's economic capital.

== List of presidents ==
- 1995–1998: Amina Alaoui, architect
- 1998–2003: Rachid Andaloussi, architect
- 2003–2006: Mustapha Chakib, architect
- 2006–2012: Abderrahim Kassou, architect
- 2012–2019: Rachid Andaloussi, architect
- 2019–present: Rabia El Ridaoui
