= Casablanca Clock Tower =

Clock tower in Casablanca, Morocco

- برج الساعة بالدار البيضاء; Tour de l'horloge de Casablanca
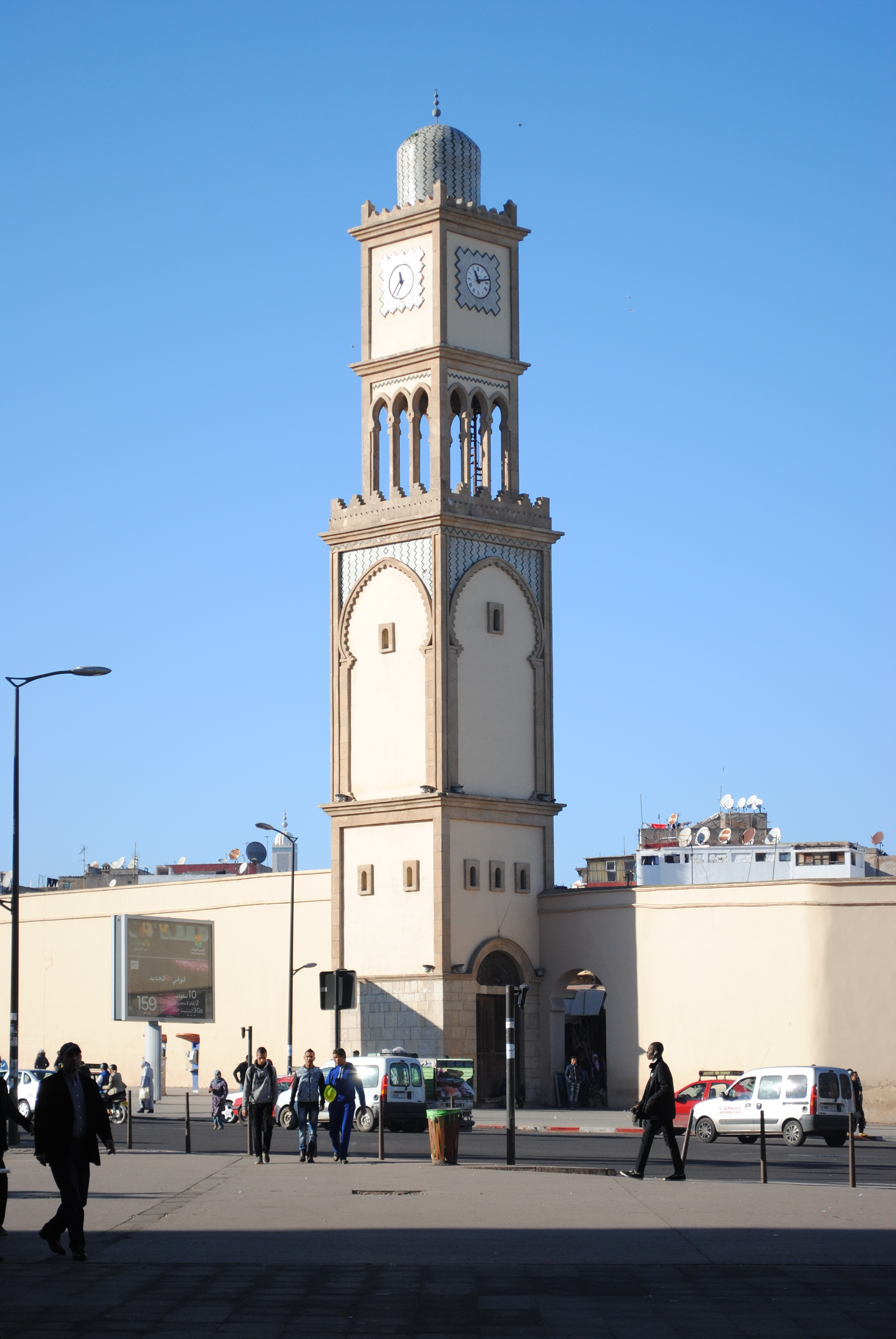
- The clock tower built in 1993, imitating the form of the original built 1909 and demolished in 1948.
- Interactive map of the Casablanca Clock Tower area

General information
- Coordinates: 33°35′49″N 7°37′02″W
- Completed: 1909
- Relocated: 1993
- Demolished: 1948

Height
- Height: 20 m (66 ft)

Design and construction
- Architect: Capitaine du Génie Bouillot

The Casablanca Clock Tower (Arabic: برج الساعة بالدار البيضاء, French: Tour de l'horloge de Casablanca) is a clock tower in Casablanca, Morocco. Located in United Nations Square, the tower is a 1993 reproduction of one of the oldest French-built structures in the city. The original tower was built in 1909 by the French commander Charles Martial Joseph Dessigny, and designed by Le Capitaine du Génie Bouillot, as an identical copy of one he had built in Aïn Séfra when stationed there previously.

It was demolished May 1948. The current tower is an almost identical copy rebuilt nearby in 1993.

== History ==
The French Army commander Charles Martial Joseph Dessigny, then head of the French department of public facilities in the recently bombarded and occupied Casablanca, ordered the construction of the tower. It was completed between 1908-1910, before the Treaty of Fes in 1912, which officially established the French Protectorate. This original tower was one of the first things built by the French colonists in Casablanca and in Morocco. It reached a height of 20 meters, like another built under Dessigny's command in Aïn Séfra in the Algerian Atlas Mountains when he was stationed there.

The clock tower carried great symbolic significance, as it was a symbol of French power and the dawning of a new order.

The original Casablanca Clock Tower, ostensibly demolished in 1948 due to structural fragility, faced its fate not just for its condition but also because it obstructed the burgeoning traffic in Place de France. It was reborn in 1993, positioned 45 meters away and rotated 45 degrees counterclockwise from its original location — a detail that resonates with its past, exactly 45 years after its demolition, adding a layer of historical intrigue to its reconstruction.

== Description ==
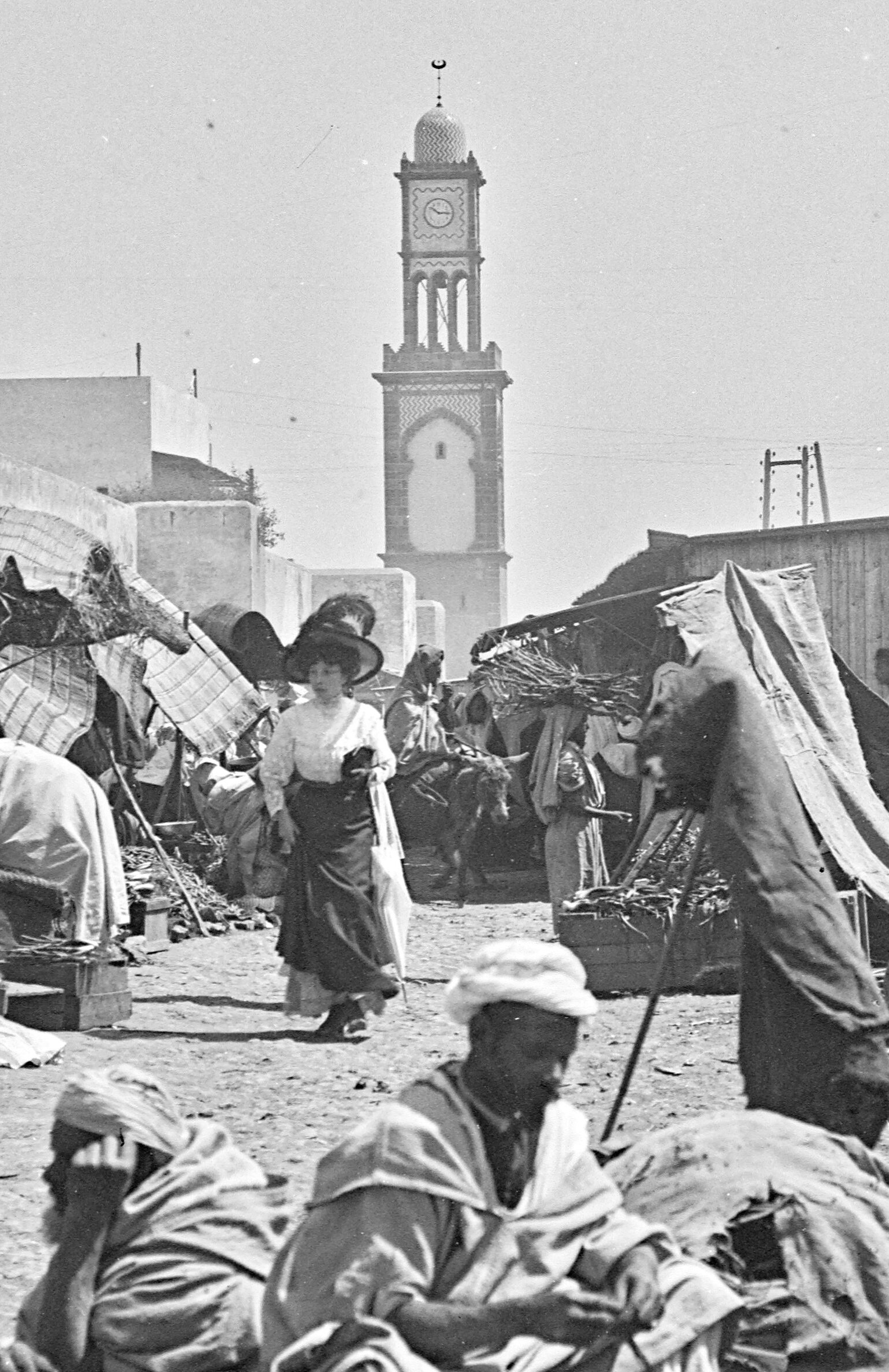
A photo of the original tower seen from the soq kbir market published in 1911, after the 1907 bombardment and before the establishment of the protectorate in 1912.

The tower imitates the form of a minaret, and like most Moroccan minarets, the tower is square-based. The tower features 4 round mechanical clock faces, one on each side of the tower. The numbers on these clock faces are in Roman numerals.
