= ANFA =

ANFA may refer to:

== Football ==
- All Nepal Football Association, the governing body of football in Nepal
- Asociación Nacional de Fútbol Amateur, the governing body of amateur Chilean football

== Other uses ==
- Academy of Neuroscience for Architecture
- Agreement on Net Financial Assets, an agreement between the European Central Bank and central banks in the Eurozone

== See also ==
- Anfa, an ancient toponym for Casablanca, Morocco
- Anfa (arrondissement), urban commune in Casablanca
