= Vehicle registration plates of Morocco =

Kingdom of Morocco
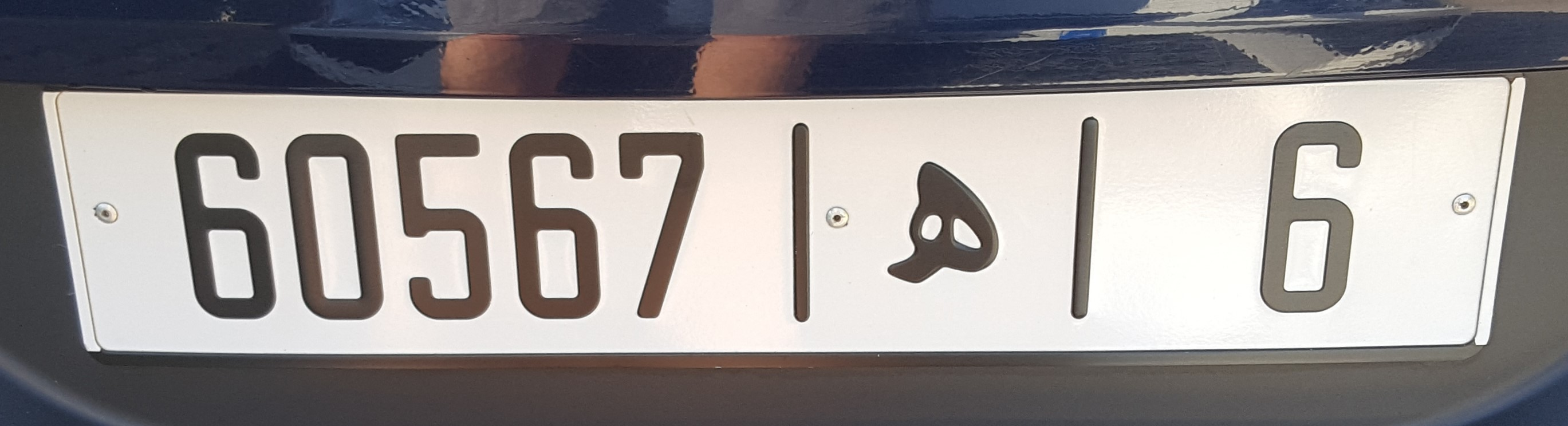
- Moroccan regular legal standard number plate.
- Country: Morocco
- Country code: MA

Current series
- Size: No specified size
- Serial format: 1(2345) A 6(7)
- Colour (front): Black on white
- Colour (rear): Black on white

Moroccan license plates match in size and appearance to a large extent the European license plates and usually show black text on a white background.

== Current series ==
=== Normal registration plates ===
Since 2000, the plates begins with a one to five-digit registration code followed by two vertical lines. In between the lines, there's an Arabic character to distinguish between series. Finally, there is a one- or two-digit regional code based on the registered address of the first owner of the vehicle in Morocco. Plates are black on white, with no graphics. The size specified was 498 × 110 mm for rear plates, and 450 × 100 for front plates,

In 2010 specifications for bilingual plates displaying a Latin letter corresponding to the Arabic letter as well as an official transliteration of the letters was published, with the plates only authorized for use for Moroccan registered vehicles traveling internationally and only allowed to be displayed within Morocco when directly en route leaving or returning to Morocco. Additionally the size of front plates was changed to 460 × 100 mm.

In July 2025, the use of bilingual plates of the 2010 specifications were made optional for use in Morocco without restriction to encourage their use on Moroccan vehicles traveling to Europe.

In August 2026, a new license plate standard was published based on the 2010 specification with the addition of the international registration code MA intragrated directly into the plate and being mandatory to display on the plates on all vehicles first registered after 3 August 2026, and that bilingal plates of the 2010 specifications without the MA are illegal to display after 1 January 2027, but vehicles registered prior to August 3rd 2026 may continue to display Arabic-only plates as long as there is no change of ownership after 1 January 2027.

The official size of one-line Moroccan plates was changed from 498 × 110 mm to 520 x 110 mm matching the standard in Europe.

Arabic letter	Latin equivalent
أ	A
ب	B
د	D
هـ	H
و	E (Note: Normally transliterates to W but E was choosen to avoid conflict with car dealer plates that use the suffix W18.)
ط	T
ي	Y
ك	K
ل	L
م	M
ن	N
ص	C (Note: Normally transliterates to S but C was choosen to differencate from س which also transliterates to S.)
ف	F
ر	R
س	S

As of November 2026, only Y has been reached on regular Moroccan plates.

The letters allocated above are for normal plates, which are installed on privately owned vehicles. For Government Vehicles, and other registration plates, continue down below.

For two-line signs the letter and region code in the top line and the serial number on the bottom appear. Same applies for motorcycle plates. Older license plates show only digits after the pattern 1234-56 | أ | 7.

Normal plates are installed on privately owned vehicles, motorcycles, taxis, public transit, trucks, trailers, and agricultural equipment. There are no exceptions or special designations.

2026 Standard single row license plate (520 × 110 mm); Front plates may optionally be made 450 × 100 mm

2026 Standard double row license plate, installed on imported vehicles that can't accommodate a single row plate. (300 × 150 mm)

Motorcycle license plate (180 × 120 mm)

==== Regional codes ====
When the current registration system was introduced in 2000, 71 regional codes were assigned to Morocco's prefectures and provinces. The codes were allocated in blocks of numbers based on the 1997-2015 Region, beginning with 1 Rabat, the national capital, followed by Casablanca, the largest city, then followed by the imperial cities of Fes, Meknes and Marrakech. With the seat of the Wilaya of each group generally receiving the lowest number.

In 2003 six prefectures were abolished or consolidated, resulting in the discontinuation of their codes in favor of those of their successor prefectures which generally was the lowest number between them.

Newly established prefectures and provinces are assigned the next available number in the sequence, beginning with Aïn Chock, which received code 72 following its creation in 2003. The table below lists the registration codes and their corresponding administrative divisions.

Moroccan vehicle registration plate codes
Code	Prefecture or province	Region (1997–2015)	Region (since 2015)	Notes
1	Rabat	Rabat-Salé-Zemmour-Zaer	Rabat-Salé-Kénitra	
2	Salé	Rabat-Salé-Zemmour-Zaer	Rabat-Salé-Kénitra	
3	Salé Al Jadida	Rabat-Salé-Zemmour-Zaer	Rabat-Salé-Kénitra	Abolished in 2003; merged into code 2
4	Skhirat-Témara	Rabat-Salé-Zemmour-Zaer	Rabat-Salé-Kénitra	
5	Khémisset	Rabat-Salé-Zemmour-Zaer	Rabat-Salé-Kénitra	
6	Casablanca-Anfa	Grand Casablanca	Casablanca-Settat	
7	Aïn Sebaâ–Hay Mohammadi	Grand Casablanca	Casablanca-Settat	
8	Hay Hassani	Grand Casablanca	Casablanca-Settat	
9	Ben M'Sick	Grand Casablanca	Casablanca-Settat	
10	Moulay Rachid	Grand Casablanca	Casablanca-Settat	
11	Al Fida–Mers Sultan	Grand Casablanca	Casablanca-Settat	
12	Méchouar Casablanca	Grand Casablanca	Casablanca-Settat	Abolished in 2003; merged into code 11
13	Sidi Bernoussi	Grand Casablanca	Casablanca-Settat	
14	Mohammedia	Grand Casablanca	Casablanca-Settat	
15	Fès	Fès-Boulemane	Fès-Meknès	
16	Fès-Médina	Fès-Boulemane	Fès-Meknès	Abolished in 2003; merged into code 15
17	Moulay Yacoub	Fès-Boulemane	Fès-Meknès	
18	Sefrou	Fès-Boulemane	Fès-Meknès	
19	Boulemane	Fès-Boulemane	Fès-Meknès	
20	Meknès	Meknès-Tafilalet	Fès-Meknès	
21	Al Ismaïlia (Meknès)	Meknès-Tafilalet	Fès-Meknès	Abolished in 2003; merged into code 20
22	El Hajeb	Meknès-Tafilalet	Fès-Meknès	
23	Ifrane	Meknès-Tafilalet	Fès-Meknès	
24	Khénifra	Meknès-Tafilalet	Béni Mellal-Khénifra	
25	Errachidia	Meknès-Tafilalet	Drâa-Tafilalet	
26	Marrakech	Marrakech-Tensift-Al Haouz	Marrakech-Safi	
27	Marrakech-Médina	Marrakech-Tensift-Al Haouz	Marrakech-Safi	Abolished in 2003; merged into code 26
28	Sidi Youssef Ben Ali	Marrakech-Tensift-Al Haouz	Marrakech-Safi	Abolished in 2003; merged into code 26
29	Al Haouz	Marrakech-Tensift-Al Haouz	Marrakech-Safi	
30	Chichaoua	Marrakech-Tensift-Al Haouz	Marrakech-Safi	
31	El Kelâa des Sraghna	Marrakech-Tensift-Al Haouz	Marrakech-Safi	
32	Essaouira	Marrakech-Tensift-Al Haouz	Marrakech-Safi	
33	Agadir-Ida-Ou-Tanane	Souss-Massa-Drâa	Souss-Massa	
34	Inezgane-Aït Melloul	Souss-Massa-Drâa	Souss-Massa	
35	Chtouka-Aït Baha	Souss-Massa-Drâa	Souss-Massa	
36	Taroudant	Souss-Massa-Drâa	Souss-Massa	
37	Tiznit	Souss-Massa-Drâa	Souss-Massa	
38	Ouarzazate	Souss-Massa-Drâa	Drâa-Tafilalet	
39	Zagora	Souss-Massa-Drâa	Drâa-Tafilalet	
40	Tanger-Assilah	Tanger-Tétouan	Tanger-Tétouan-Al Hoceïma	
41	Fahs-Anjra	Tanger-Tétouan	Tanger-Tétouan-Al Hoceïma	
42	Larache	Tanger-Tétouan	Tanger-Tétouan-Al Hoceïma	
43	Chefchaouen	Tanger-Tétouan	Tanger-Tétouan-Al Hoceïma	
44	Tétouan	Tanger-Tétouan	Tanger-Tétouan-Al Hoceïma	
45	Al Hoceima	Taza-Al Hoceïma-Taounate	Tanger-Tétouan-Al Hoceïma	
46	Taza	Taza-Al Hoceïma-Taounate	Fès-Meknès	
47	Taounate	Taza-Al Hoceïma-Taounate	Fès-Meknès	
48	Oujda-Angad	Oriental	Oriental	
49	Berkane	Oriental	Oriental	
50	Nador	Oriental	Oriental	
51	Taourirt	Oriental	Oriental	
52	Jerada	Oriental	Oriental	
53	Figuig	Oriental	Oriental	
54	Safi	Doukkala-Abda	Marrakech-Safi	
55	El Jadida	Doukkala-Abda	Casablanca-Settat	
56	Settat	Chaouia-Ouardigha	Casablanca-Settat	
57	Khouribga	Chaouia-Ouardigha	Béni Mellal-Khénifra	
58	Benslimane	Chaouia-Ouardigha	Casablanca-Settat	
59	Kénitra	Gharb-Chrarda-Béni Hssen	Rabat-Salé-Kénitra	
60	Sidi Kacem	Gharb-Chrarda-Béni Hssen	Rabat-Salé-Kénitra	
61	Béni Mellal	Tadla-Azilal	Béni Mellal-Khénifra	
62	Azilal	Tadla-Azilal	Béni Mellal-Khénifra	
63	Es-Semara	Guelmim-Es Semara	Laâyoune-Sakia El Hamra	
64	Guelmim	Guelmim-Es Semara	Guelmim-Oued Noun	
65	Tan-Tan	Guelmim-Es Semara	Guelmim-Oued Noun	
66	Tata	Guelmim-Es Semara	Souss-Massa	
67	Assa-Zag	Guelmim-Es Semara	Guelmim-Oued Noun	
68	Laâyoune	Laâyoune-Boujdour-Sakia El Hamra	Laâyoune-Sakia El Hamra	
69	Boujdour	Laâyoune-Boujdour-Sakia El Hamra	Laâyoune-Sakia El Hamra	
70	Oued Ed-Dahab	Oued Ed-Dahab-Lagouira	Dakhla-Oued Ed-Dahab	
71	Aousserd	Oued Ed-Dahab-Lagouira	Dakhla-Oued Ed-Dahab	
72	Aïn Chock (Casablanca)	Grand Casablanca	Casablanca-Settat	Created in 2003
73	Nouaceur	Grand Casablanca	Casablanca-Settat	Created in 2003
74	Médiouna	Grand Casablanca	Casablanca-Settat	Created in 2003
75	M'diq-Fnideq	Tanger-Tétouan	Tanger-Tétouan-Al Hoceïma	Prefecture created in 2004
76	Driouch	Oriental	Oriental	Province created in 2009
77	Guercif	Taza-Al Hoceïma-Taounate	Oriental	Province created in 2009
78	Ouezzane	Tanger-Tétouan	Tanger-Tétouan-Al Hoceïma	Province created in 2009
79	Sidi Slimane	Gharb-Chrarda-Béni Hssen	Rabat-Salé-Kénitra	Province created in 2009
80	Midelt	Meknès-Tafilalet	Drâa-Tafilalet	Province created in 2009
81	Berrechid	Chaouia-Ouardigha	Casablanca-Settat	Province created in 2009
82	Sidi Bennour	Doukkala-Abda	Casablanca-Settat	Province created in 2009
83	Rehamna (Ben Guerir)	Marrakech-Tensift-Al Haouz	Marrakech-Safi	Province created in 2009
84	Fquih Ben Salah	Tadla-Azilal	Béni Mellal-Khénifra	Province created in 2009
85	Youssoufia	Doukkala-Abda	Marrakech-Safi	Province created in 2009
86	Tinghir	Souss-Massa-Drâa	Drâa-Tafilalet	Province created in 2009
87	Sidi Ifni	Guelmim-Es Semara	Guelmim-Oued Noun	Province created in 2009
88	Tarfaya	Laâyoune-Boujdour-Sakia El Hamra	Laâyoune-Sakia El Hamra	Province created in 2009

=== Trailer plates ===
Semi-trailers heavier than a Gross weight of 750 kg are allocated two plates. They are allocated a normal plate, as previously discussed, as well as a special plate. This plate is white on red, and follows a format of [#### - ##].

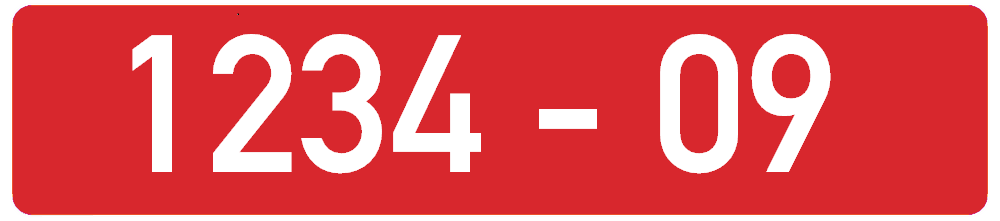

=== Temporary plates ===
There are two temporary plates, the "W18" format and the "WW" format.

Vehicles that are still owned by the dealership, or are being tested, and are not sold yet, are assigned a "W18" format plate. These plates are issued nationally, and do not correspond to the previously mentioned regional codes. "W18" plates are red on white, and follow the format [##### W 18].

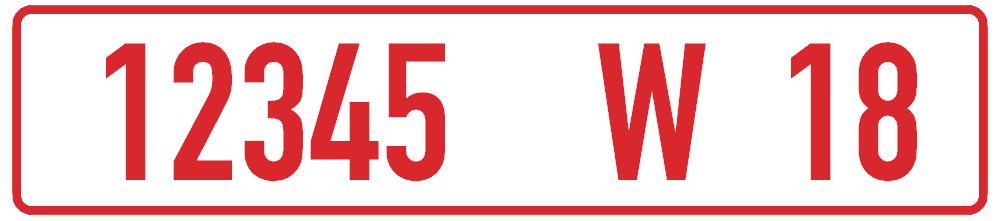

Newly purchased vehicles in Morocco are assigned temporary sticker tags ending with the letters "WW" for one month until a permanent registration plate is assigned. These plates are issued nationally, and do not correspond to the previously mentioned regional codes. "WW" plates are black on white, and follow the format [###### WW].

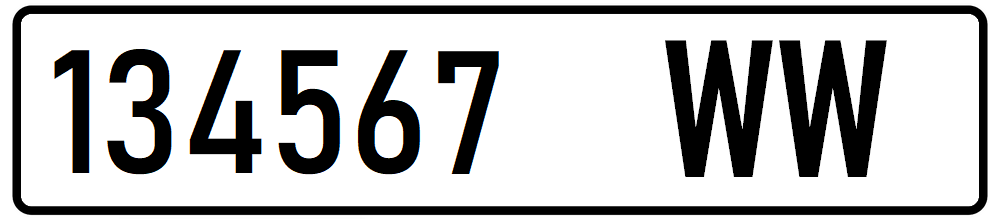

=== Diplomatic plates ===
Moroccan diplomatic license plates have a blue background and show in the left margin the letters "CD" for Corps Diplomatique and Maroc. The other side of the plate shows هـ د and المغرب in Arabic script. هـ د stands for هيئة دبلوماسية meaning Diplomatic Corps. Between these two blocks, two pairs of numbers appear, the latter indicating the country of origin.

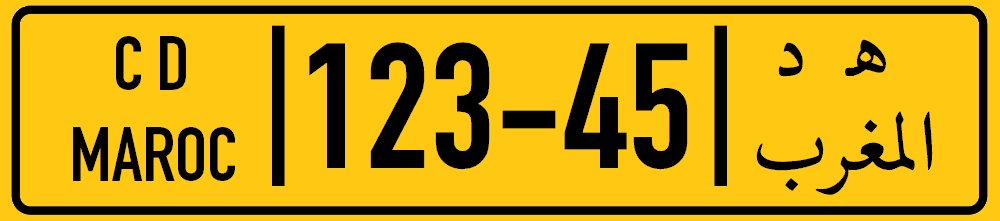

=== International cooperative plates ===
"International Cooperative" is defined as international organizations such as the UN, or the African Union. Moroccan International cooperative license plates have a yellow background and show in the left margin the letters "CI" for Coopération Internationale and Maroc. The other side of the plate shows ت د and المغرب in Arabic script. ت د stands for تعاونية الدولية, meaning 'international cooperative'. Between these two blocks, two pairs of numbers appear. These plates are no longer in use since 2021.

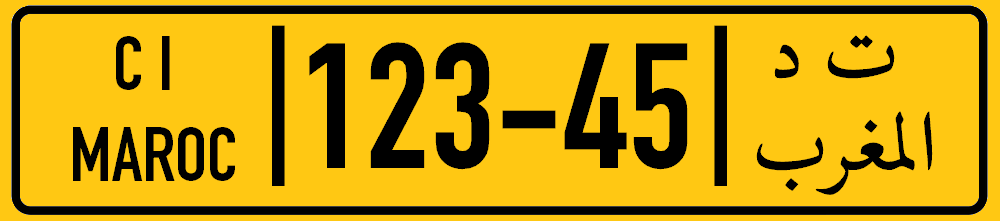

=== Government owned civilian vehicles ===
Government owned civilian vehicles are designated their own format of license plates. These license plates are white on black and consist of 6-digits in white, then in red, المغرب (Morocco in Arabic), or the Latin letter M for state owned vehicle, or the letter ج or J' for local government owned vehicle, This letter stands for الجماعات الترابية, meaning territorial collectivity, the official term for local government units in Morocco.

Typical 1-line license plate, having a size complaint with that of European Union license plates, 520 x 110 mm

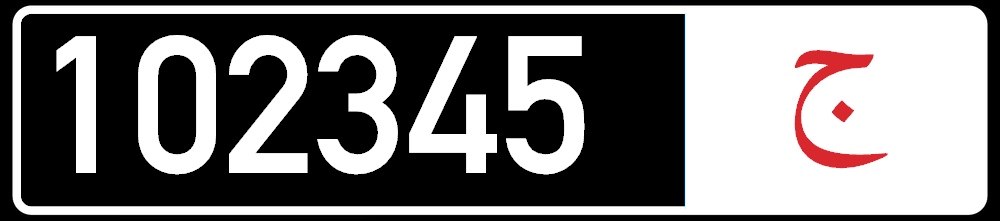

Typical 2-line license plate, installed on imported vehicles that can't accommodate a standard 1-line plate. 300 x 150 mm

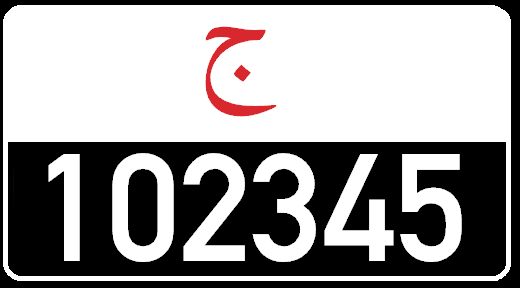

=== Civil protection plates ===
Civil Protection vehicles, such as ambulances and fire trucks, are designated their own format of license plates. These license plates are black on white and consist of 6-digits. They also have designating letters و م (Latin equivalent being W M) in red, on a white background. These Arabic letters stand for الوقاية المدنية meaning Civil Protection.

Typical 1-line license plate, having a size complaint with that of European Union license plates, 520 × 110 mm

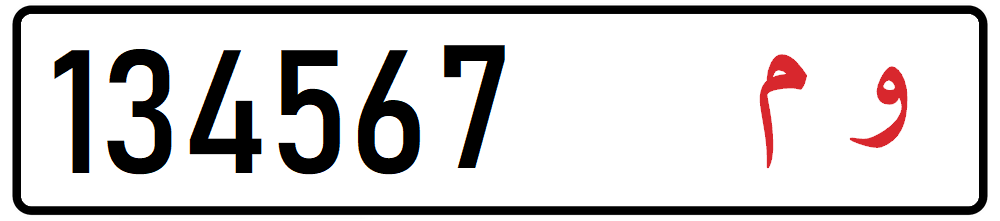

Typical 2-line license plate, installed on imported vehicles that can't accommodate a standard 1-line plate. 300 × 150 mm

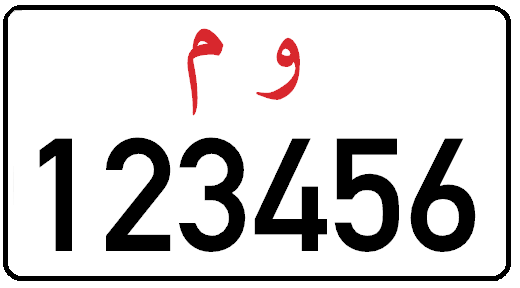

=== Police vehicles ===
Police vehicles are designated their own format of license plates. These license plates are white on black and consist of 6-digits. They also have a designating letter ش (Latin equivalent being Š/Sh) in red, on a white background. This letter stands for "الشرطة" meaning Police.

Typical 1-line license plate, having a size complaint with that of European Union license plates, 520 x 110 mm

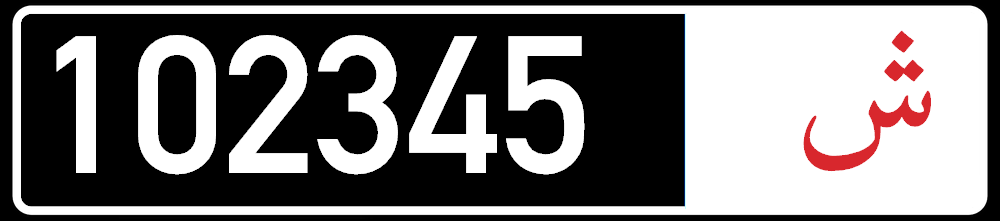

Typical 2-line license plate, installed on imported vehicles that can't accommodate a standard 1-line plate. 300 x 150 mm

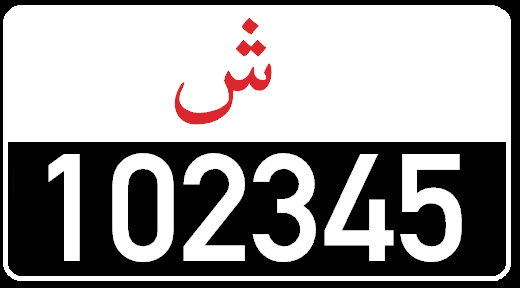

=== Auxiliary Forces vehicles ===
Auxiliary Forces are an additional paramilitary force in Morocco, their vehicles are designated their own format of license plates. These license plates are white on black and consist of 6-digits. They also have a designating letter ق س (Latin equivalent being Q S) in red, on a white background. These letters stands for القوات المساعدة, although it is not a perfect acronym.

Typical 1-line license plate, having a size complaint with that of European Union license plates, 520 × 110 mm

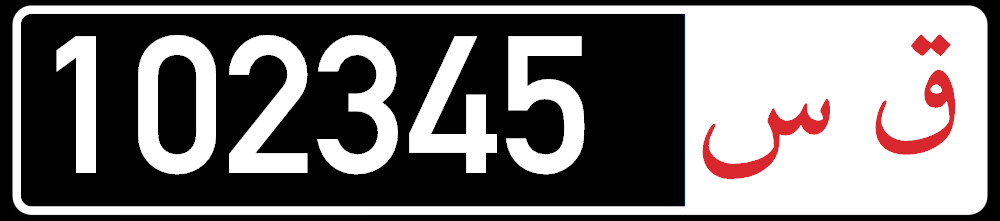

Typical 2-line license plate, installed on imported vehicles that can't accommodate a standard 1-line plate. 300 × 150 mm

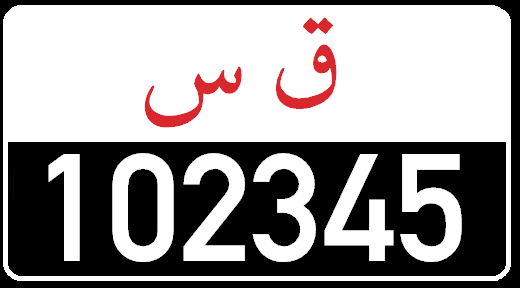

=== Military vehicles ===
Vehicles belonging to the Royal Moroccan Armed Forces are designated their own format of license plates. These license plates are white on black and consist of 6-digits. On the right hand side, they have the Moroccan Flag, and on the left hand side, the Moroccan Army Insignia. They also have a designating letter ق م م (Latin equivalent being Q M M) in white on a black background. This letter stands for القوات المسلحة الملكية meaning 'Royal Armed Forces', color coded by branch, with Army plates being dark green, and Navy plates being blue.

The Navy's vehicles show the crest of their branch and have a blue background.

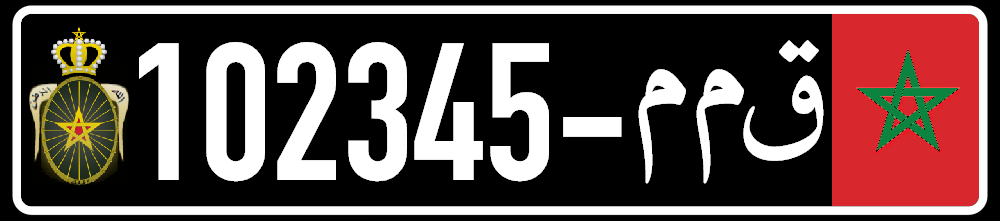

== Gallery ==
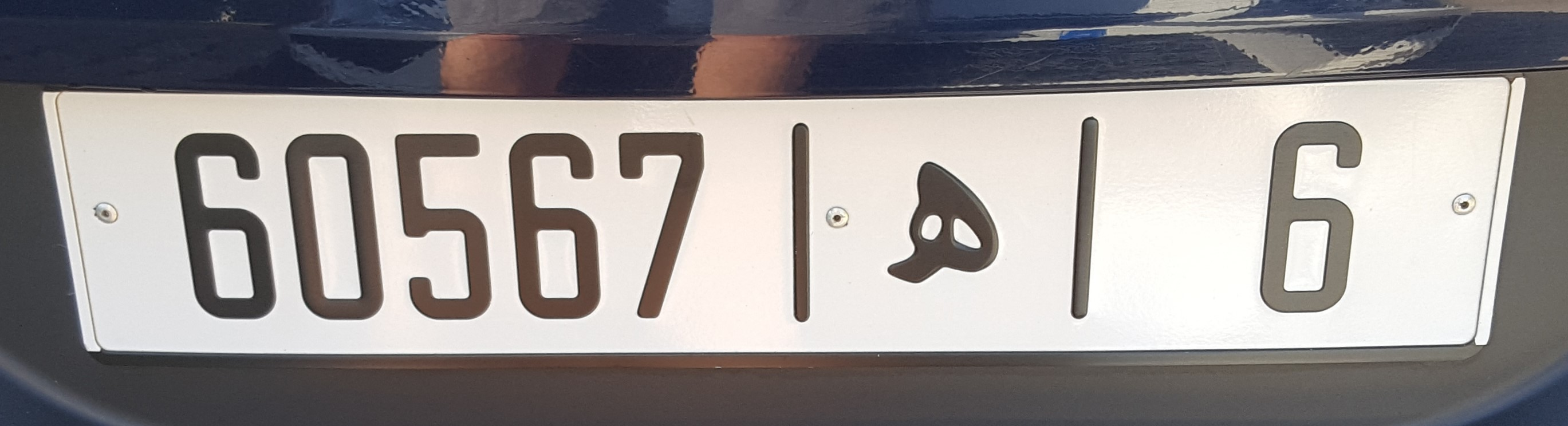
Plate from Casablanca Anfa.

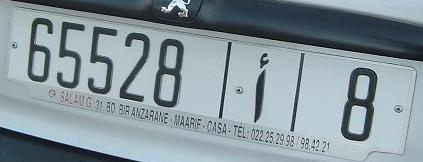
Plate from Casablanca Hay Hassani.

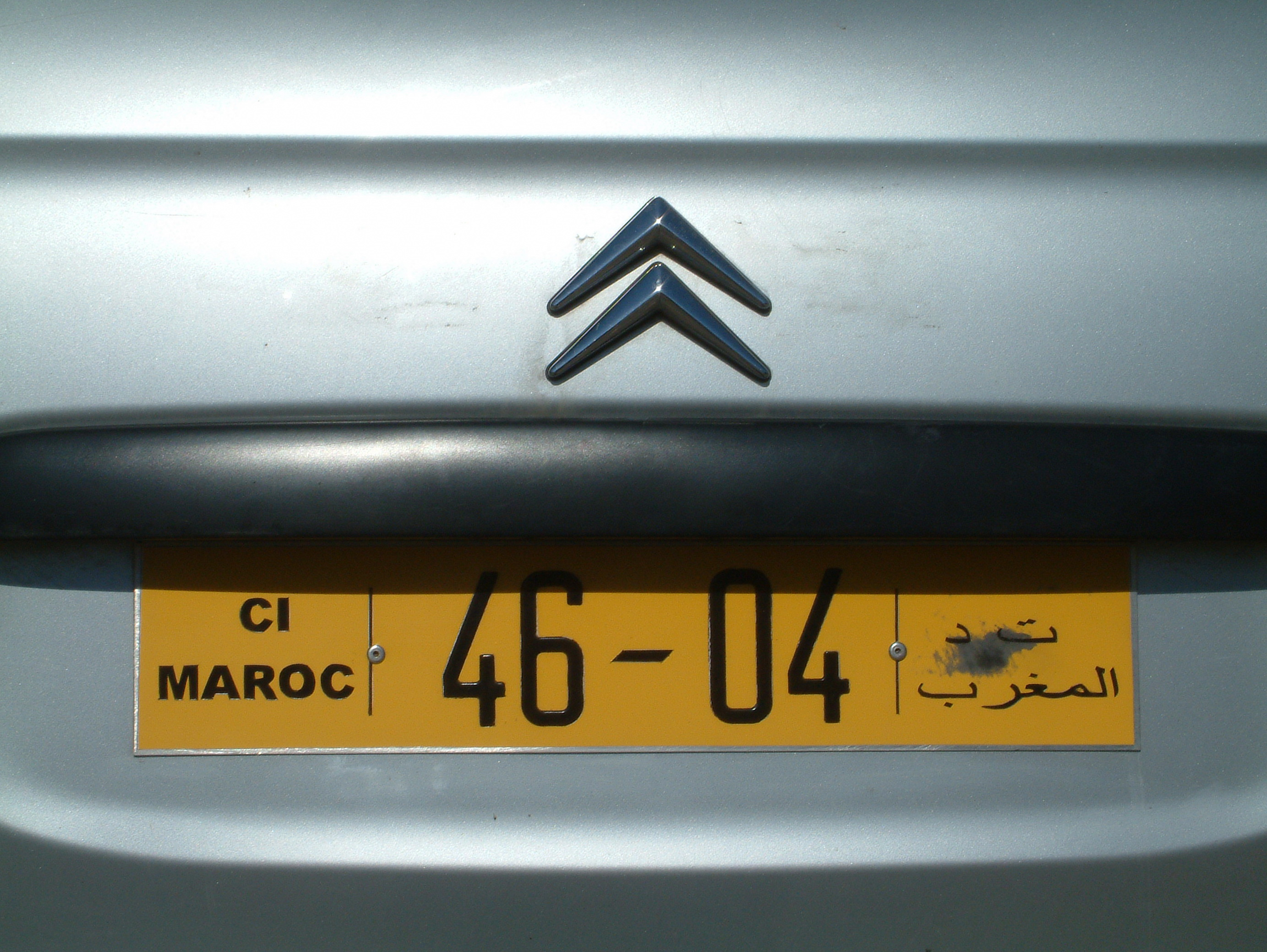
International Organization Plate.

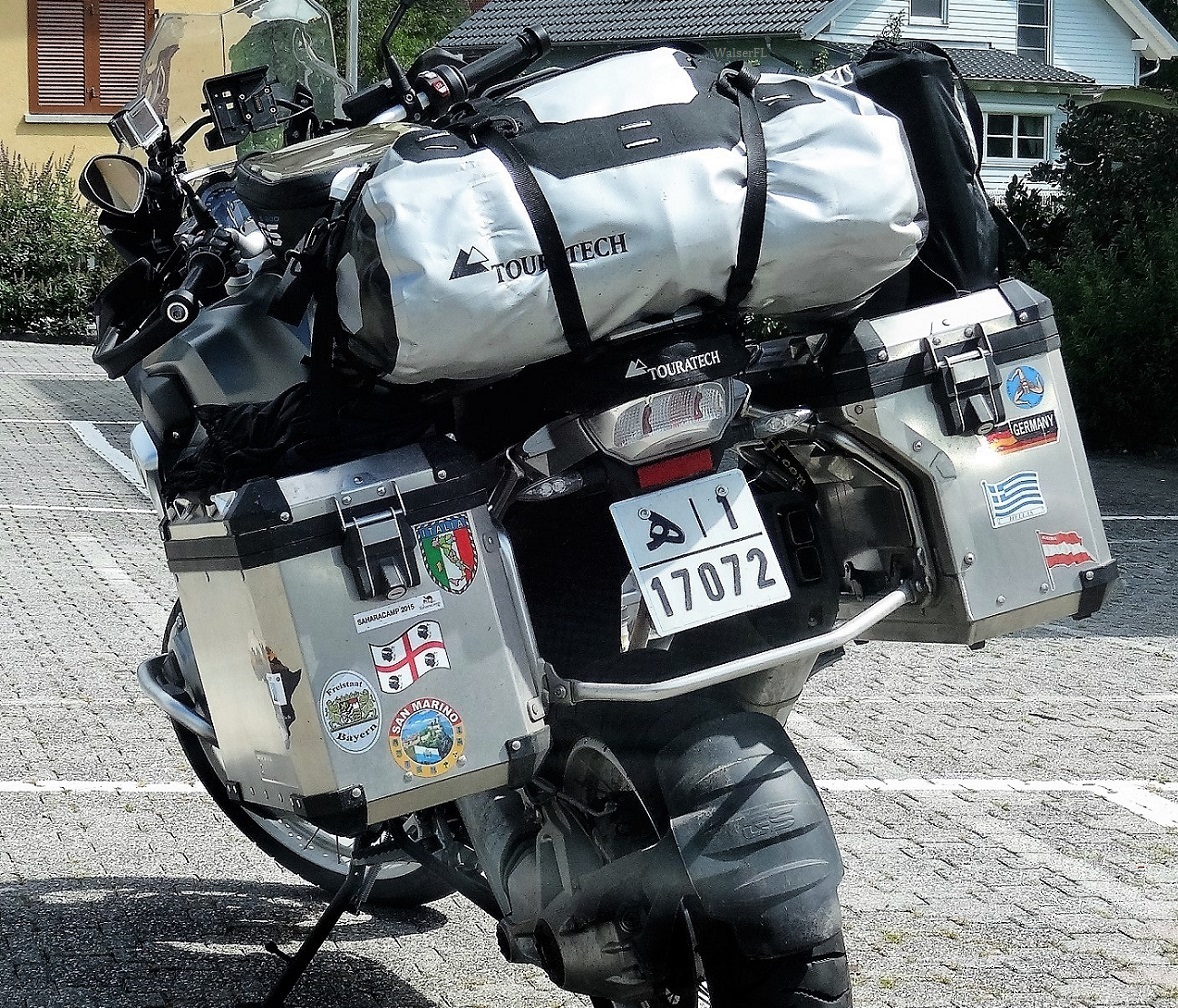
Motorcycle Plate from Rabat.

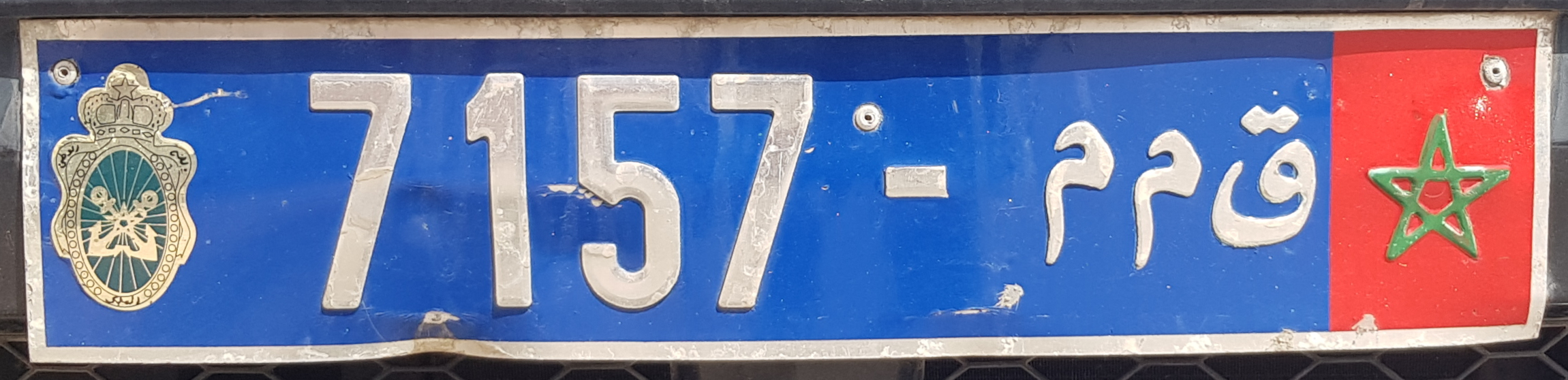
Navy's vehicles.
