= Villa Camembert =

- Villa du Docteur B
- Interactive map of the Villa Camembert area

General information
- Location: Casablanca, Morocco

Design and construction
- Architect: Wolfgang Ewerth

The Villa of Doctor B (Arabic: فيلا الدكتور ب), popularly known as Villa Camembert or Villa Ronde is a private villa in the Anfa Supérieur neighborhood of Casablanca, Morocco. It was designed by the German architect Wolfgang Ewerth and in 1962.

== Architecture ==
The villa is popularly known as Villa Ronde and Villa Camembert due to its round shape and resemblance to a Camembert cheese wheel. It contains a traditional Moroccan salon, though it is round.

== Gallery ==

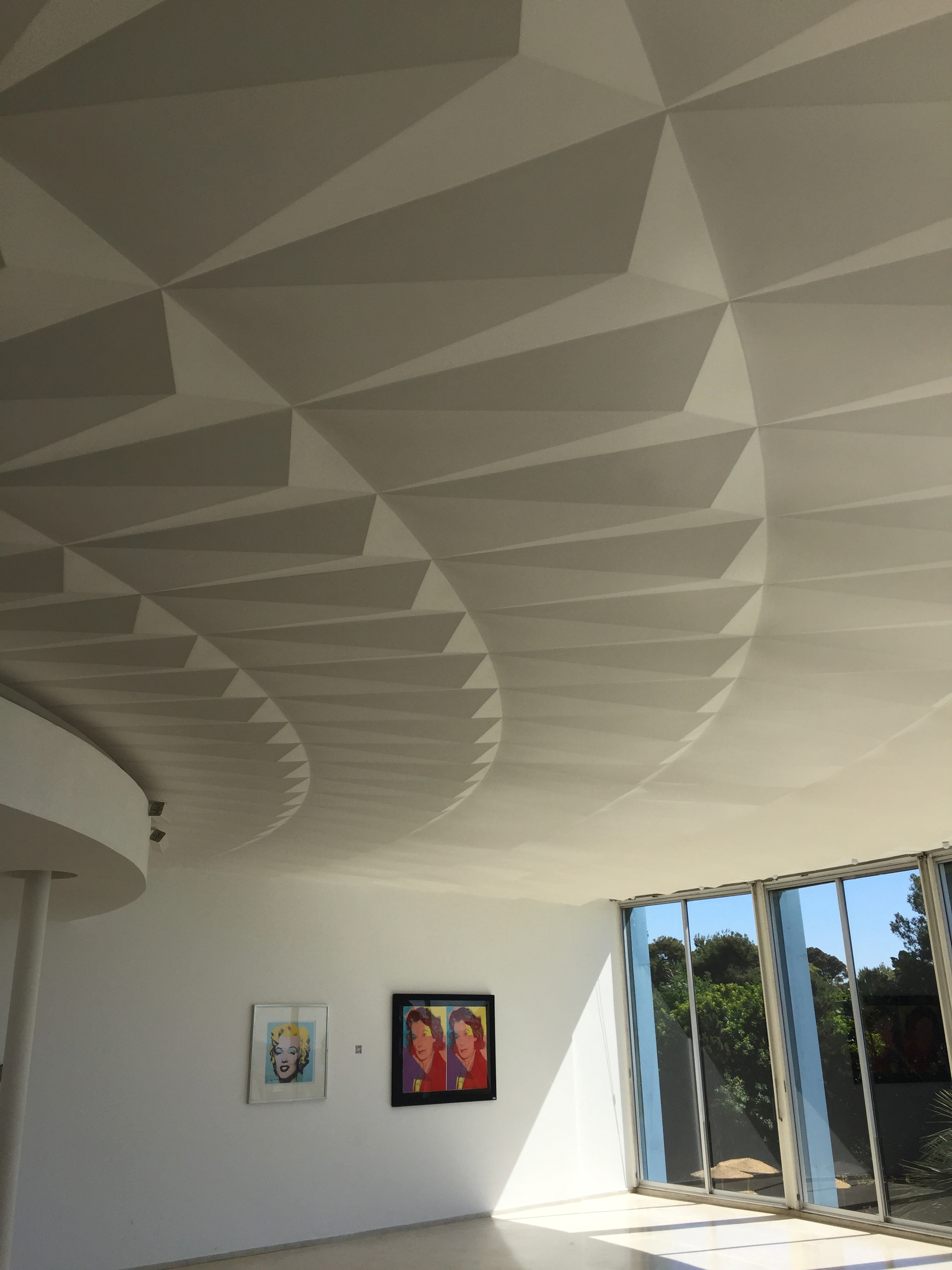
