= Conscious city =

Environment that responds to the needs of its inhabitants

A conscious city is a large built environment that is aware of the needs and activities of its inhabitants and responds to them. Research in conscious cities explores how architecture and urban design can better consider and respond to human needs through data analysis, artificial intelligence, and the application of cognitive science in design.

While a smart city focuses on improving the efficiency of services, a conscious city applies new technology and behavioral insight into improving the experience and its mental and physiological effects. It is believed that conscious cities could alleviate ailments such as stress, anxiety and boredom by being sensitive to the pervading moods and personalities of people in different parts of the city.

The term was coined by architect Itai Palti and neuroscientist Moshe Bar in their Manifesto for Conscious Cities, published in The Guardian in 2015. Palti went on to establish the conscious cities movement, stating, "The challenge is twofold and symbiotic: to empower and facilitate designers to use [conscious design], and to convince policy-makers, and through them, also market-players that a new set of priorities is essential." The movement launched the Conscious Cities journal in November 2016.

The first conscious cities conference, called "Conscious Cities - Architecture and Neuroscience", was held in 2016.

== History ==
Throughout history, environments were designed to affect people's mood, but the practice was never systematic.

Henri Lefebvre, who pioneered the "right to the city", argued in The Production of Space (1974) that space was a social product, a complex social construction based on values and the social production of meanings, which affected spatial practices and perceptions. Championing Lefebvre's ideas, David Harvey said: "The right to the city is far more than the individual liberty to access urban resources: it is a right to change ourselves by changing the city."

Amos Rapoport examined meaning in the built environment, arguing that a place had not only physical features, but also meanings perceived and decoded by people on the basis of their own expectations, roles, experiences, and motivations.

The 21st century brought big data and crowdsourcing, which provide much deeper insights into the relations between cities and their inhabitants.

== Characteristics and practice ==
Architecture, interior design, and urban planning can affect human behaviors and mental processes, causing psychological, biophysical, and cognitive changes in people, often without them noticing. Analyzing how people perceive public spaces with their senses makes it possible to analyze people's place-making practices. For example, visual elements of mystery and complexity may encourage exploration and feelings of pleasure, especially in familiar situations. On the other hand, visual concealments may increase people's fear of crime in public settings. A simple example of a conscious city element is a pair of giant self-inflating artificial flowers in Jerusalem, which bloom to create shade from the sun or cover from rain when sensing approaching pedestrians.

Regarding wayfinding, a conscious city would facilitate memorable mental maps through carefully designing all its elements by focusing on both the physical and the emotional needs of its users. As the average European is getting older, more attention is being paid to making cities "age-friendly," especially with dementia, where conscious-city strategies include "reminiscence promenades," active ground floor frontage, and walkable mixed-use areas.

The mass collection of human data required by conscious cities has raised questions of ethics and privacy. Moreover, a conscious city can react negatively to certain groups by using "hostile architecture," such as sloped public benches to deter homeless people or high-frequency emitters to keep children away.

== Research ==
Initiatives like the Centre for Urban Design and Mental Health, the Urban Realities Laboratory, the Bartlett Centre for Advanced Spatial Analysis, Conscious Design Kalpa or the Center for Advanced Design Research and Evaluation have been examining the effects of urban planning and policymaking on human psychology and mental health. The Academy of Neuroscience for Architecture promotes and advances the application of neuroscience to human responses to the built environment. The Centric Lab was established in London in 2016 as the first group researching Conscious Design, "that which has an awareness of, and responsibility towards its users."

EEG brain scanning has been researched to emotionally map human reactions to environments in terms of excitement, frustration and engagement, particularly in response to stimuli such as sound, air pollution, and light. The architecture firm Perkins and Will has a Human Experience Lab that tests out design concepts and measures human responses through electroencephalography devices, eye tracking, galvanic skin response, motion detectors, and accelerometers. The lab also uses virtual reality headsets and immersive cave automatic virtual environments to test out visual and auditory simulations of planned designs.

CHORA Conscious City, an architecture research facility, started a conscious city project for Gela in 2015 to give the Sicilian town "an avant-garde role in the perspective of a new development model in the Mediterranean, turning it into a portal of transit between two continents, Europe and Africa."
