= John Paul Eberhard =

American architect and academic (1927–2020)

John Paul Eberhard FAIA (January 29, 1927 – May 2, 2020) was an American research architect and academic. He was the 2003 recipient of the Latrobe Prize.

== Early life and education ==
Eberhard was born in Chicago, Illinois, in 1927. He was drafted into the U.S. Marines in 1945 and served as a midshipman in the U.S. Navy. He graduated from the University of Illinois Urbana-Champaign in 1952. In 1957, he was awarded a Sloan Fellowship at Massachusetts Institute of Technology.

== Career ==
After getting his undergraduate degree, Eberhard started Creative Buildings, LLC (1952–1958). In 1956, he earned a design patent (#178,116) for a prefabricated chapel based on some of the work Creative Buildings had been getting from Lutheran congregations in the Midwest. After getting his degree from MIT, Eberhard took a job as the Director of Research, Sheraton Hotel Corporation (1959–1963) under Thomas Boylston Adams. In 1963, Eberhard moved to DC to become special assistant to Herb Holloman, the Assistant Secretary of Commerce under the Kennedy Administration. A year later, the National Bureau of Standards, now the National Institute for Standards and Technology, was reorganized under Holloman, and Eberhard became Deputy Director and then Director of the Institute of Applied Technology (1964–1968). From 1968 to 1973, Eberhard was the first dean of the School of Architecture and Environmental Design at the University at Buffalo, where he also established the Buffalo Organization for Social and Technological Innovation (BOSTI). From 1973 to 1978, Eberhard moved back to the DC area where he was president of the American Institute of Architects Research Corporation, which focused on a broad spectrum of architectural research, including energy conservation and renewable energy, natural disaster mitigation strategies, human factors, and performance-based building codes. From 1981 to 1988, Eberhard served as Executive Director of the Building Research Board at the National Academy of Sciences, now the National Academies of Sciences, Engineering, and Medicine. Published works during his tenure include Technological Alternatives for Urban Infrastructure: Five Papers Associated With a Workshop Held at Lake Morey Inn, Fairlee, Vermont on August 12–16, 1984, Building Diagnostics: A Conceptual Framework, and Infrastructure for the 21st Century: Framework for a Research Agenda. In 1989, Eberhard was appointed to the position of Head of the School of Architecture at Carnegie Mellon University. In 1995, Eberhard became the Director of Discovery at the American Architectural Foundation (1995–99). In 2003, Eberhard became the founder of the Academy of Neuroscience for Architecture and its first president.

== Contributions ==
The Academy of Neuroscience for Architecture "...took shape in 2002 as a Legacy Project to the national American Institute of Architects (AIA) Convention." Through discussions about neuroscience with Dr. Gerald Edelman of the Neuroscience Institute and Dr. Fred "Rusty" Gage of the Salk Institute for Biological Studies, Eberhard developed a vision for what would become ANFA, to focus on how neuroscience could help explain architectural experiences. Eberhard brought together neuroscientists from the Salk Institute and architects across the country, including the University of California, San Diego, to discuss how neuroscience and architecture could learn from each other and figure out ways to improve the built environment. Eberhard was introduced to possibilities of how neuroscience might influence humans' interactions with space and design through his work at the American Architectural Foundation at the American Institute of Architects. Eberhard explained, "By 2003, when the San Diego Chapter began their efforts to create an AIA Convention Legacy Project, I was pretty much up the curve in terms of understanding neuroscience; probably the only architect at that time who was." In June 2003, Eberhard was awarded the AIA College of Fellows Latrobe Prize that provided $100,000 over two years for research and led to the founding of ANFA

ANFA has established the John Paul Eberhard Fellowship to "promote and advance knowledge that links neuroscience research to a growing understanding of human responses to the built environment."

== Personal life ==
Eberhard died from complications of COVID-19 and congestive heart failure in Gaithersburg, Maryland, on May 2, 2020. He was 93.

== Bibliography ==
- Brain Landscape: The Coexistence of Neuroscience and Architecture
- Architecture and the Brain: A New Knowledge Base from Neuroscience
- Mind in Architecture: Neuroscience, Embodiment, and the Future of Design
