= Gonda Multidisciplinary Brain Research Center =

Neuroscience institution in Israel

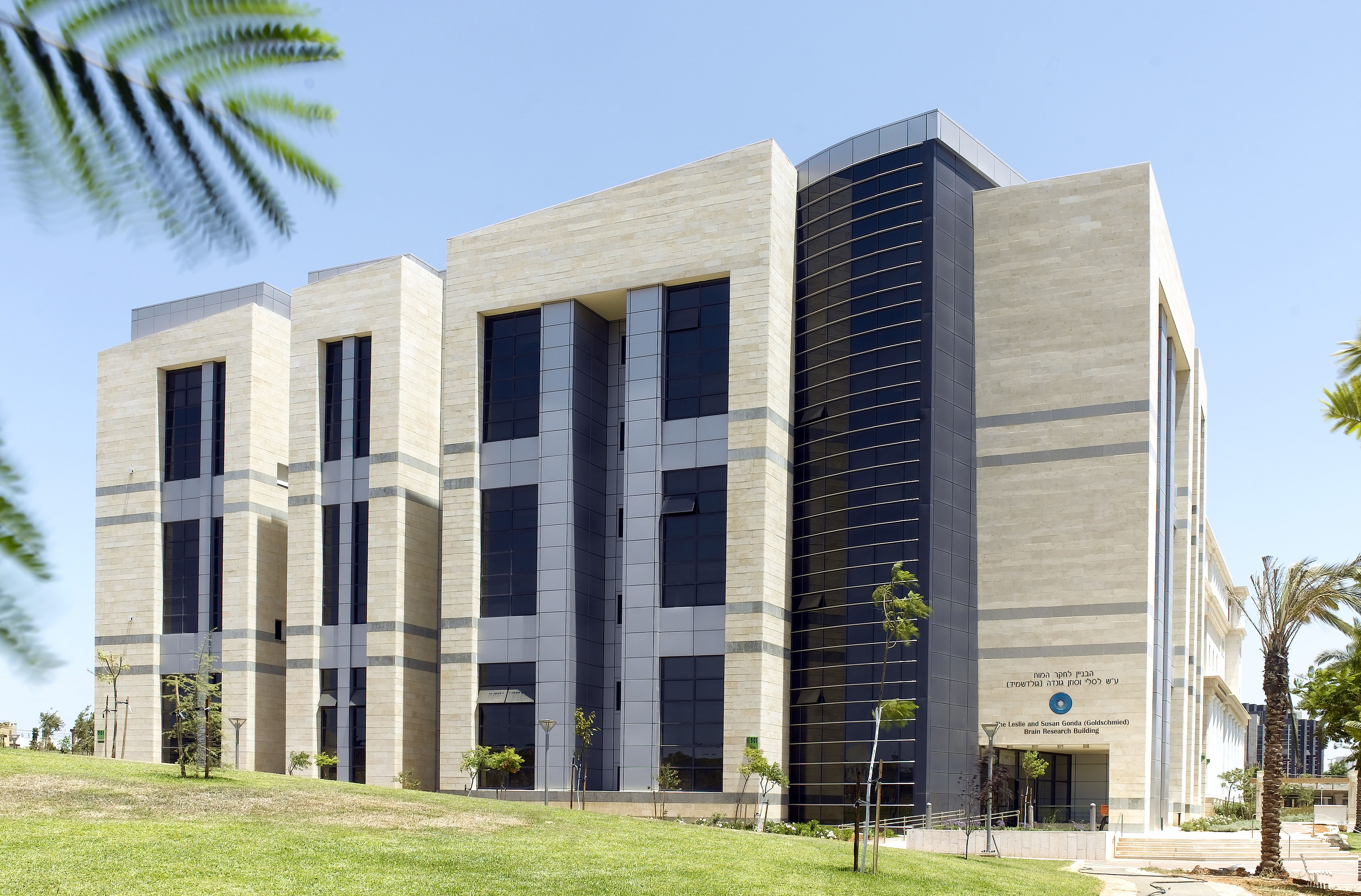
Multidisciplinary Brain Research Center at Bar-Ilan University

Leslie and Susan Gonda Multidisciplinary Brain Research Center (Hebrew: המרכז הרב תחומי לחקר המוח ע″ש לסלי וסוזן גונדה) is a multidisciplinary neuroscience institution in Israel. It is affiliated with Bar-Ilan University.

The center engages in research in multiple fields crucial for brain understanding, including molecular and systems neuroscience, cognitive neuroscience, psychology, psychiatry, linguistics, mathematics, computer sciences, engineering and physics. Numerous research approaches are employed, among them brain stimulation techniques, neuroimaging, electrophysiology, molecular techniques, computational methods, mathematical modeling and behavioral and cognitive paradigms.

The center houses over 30 laboratories that investigate brain complexity at multiple levels, from single neurons, through information processing and computations in neural networks to cognition, behavior and human mind.

== History ==
The center was founded in 2002 with the financial support of the Gonda family. The project was headed by president of Bar-Ilan University, Moshe Kaveh, and Moshe Abeles, a pioneer of Israel's neuroscience research, Emet Prize laureate (2004) and founding director of the Hebrew University's Interdisciplinary Center for Neural Computation.

Since 2011, the center is headed by Moshe Bar, a cognitive neuroscientist and an expert in brain imaging technologies. Bar returned to Israel to head the Gonda Multidisciplinary Brain Research Center as its new director after thirteen years at Harvard University.

== Magnetoencephalography ==
The Center hosts the only magnetoencephalography facility in Israel, operated by the Electromagnetic Brain Imaging Unit established in 2008. Magnetoencephalography is a brain imaging technique that allows studying human brain responses by measuring the magnetic fields produced by electrical brain activity at superb (millisecond) temporal resolution. The unit is headed by Professor Abraham Goldstein. It is equipped with a 248 magnetometer sensors whole-head system, positioned inside a double-wall magnetically shielded room by IMEDCO. Once a week, magnetoencephalography is dedicated to serving the community by providing clinical and diagnostic services, such as localization of epileptic foci, via BrainMap.

== Programs of study ==
The center's mission is to cultivate a new generation of interdisciplinary scientists who integrate knowledge from different fields. The center offers several graduate level tracks, including a direct Ph.D. program, an M.Sc. program, and a combined program.

Candidates are accepted from a variety of backgrounds, including biology, psychology, mathematics, physics, and computer science. Accepted students are exempt from tuition and receive a full scholarship during the course of their studies, allowing to fully concentrate on the research.

The Ph.D. training program builds on six single-semester required core courses, a set of preparatory courses, and a variety of elective courses. Students have to complete 8 credits in advanced courses. Additionally, students participate in a number of multidisciplinary activities including a weekly research seminar and two hands-on short-term research projects. Several advanced optional courses are available, allowing students to specialize in one of the three sub-fields:

1. Computational Neuroscience
2. Neurobiology and Behavior
3. Language and Cognition

The center also offers an undergraduate interdisciplinary program in neuroscience, providing a solid knowledge base in wide range of neuroscience related disciplines, such as life sciences, psychology, linguistics, mathematics and computer sciences, and physics, with a specialization in the field of choice.

The center takes part in the summer science research internship program, where undergraduate science majors from American universities perform research internships in Bar-Ilan labs under the mentorship of faculty members.
