= Moshe Bar (neuroscientist) =

Israeli cognitive neuroscientist

- משה בר
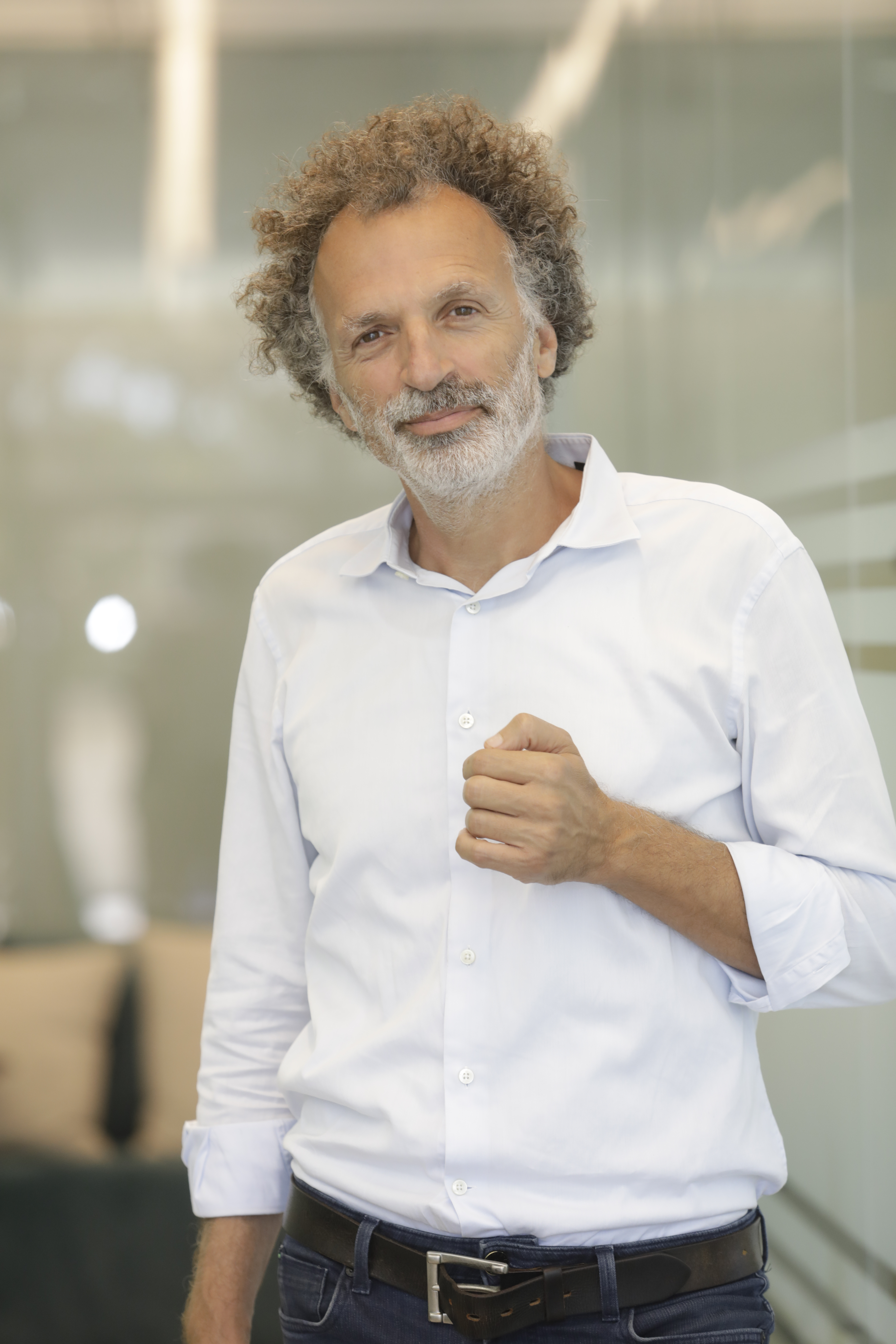
- Born: 1964 (age 61–62); Dimona, Israel
- Education: Ben-Gurion University; The Weizmann Institute of Science; University of Southern California; Harvard University
- Scientific career
- Fields: Cognitive neuroscience
- Institutions: Bar-Ilan University; Harvard Medical School

Moshe Bar (Hebrew: משה בר; born 1964) is an Israeli cognitive neuroscientist. He is a professor at Bar-Ilan University. He was previously head of the Gonda Multidisciplinary Brain Research Center at Bar-Ilan University and before that director of the Cognitive Neuroscience Laboratory at Harvard Medical School and Massachusetts General Hospital.

Bar's research focuses on various aspects of brain function, including memory, foresight, mental load, mind-wandering, mood, and creativity. Bar has also contributed to the development of conscious cities, which takes into account the effects of urban design on mental health.

He has published over 80 research articles, edited two scientific books and published the popular science book Mindwandering.

== Biography ==
Bar completed a bachelor's degree in electrical engineering at Ben-Gurion University in 1988. Thereafter, in parallel with military service in the Israeli Air Force, he completed a master's degree in computer science and applied mathematics in 1994 at the Weizmann Institute of Science, where he worked under the supervision of Shimon Ullman.

He pursued doctoral studies in psychology at the University of Southern California, under the supervision of Irving Biederman, earning a Ph.D. in 1998. He continued with postdoctoral research at the psychology department at Harvard University, collaborating with Daniel Schacter and Roger Tootel. Since 2000, Bar held a joint faculty appointment at Harvard Medical School and Massachusetts General Hospital as the director of the Cognitive Neuroscience Laboratory, before returning to Israel in 2011 to head the Gonda Multidisciplinary Brain Research Center at Bar-Ilan University.

In 2022 Bar published the popular science book Mindwandering: How Your Constant Mental Drift Can Improve Your Mood and Boost Your Creativity.

Bar is a fellow of the Society of Experimental Psychologists and of the American Psychological Association.

In 2021, Bar co-founded the Israeli mental health startup company Hedonia together with Samuel Keret and Adi Pundak-Mintz, designing therapeutic mobile games based on a method developed by Bar called Facilitating Thought Progression (FTP), which aims to reduce symptoms of depression.

== Selected publications ==
=== Scientific articles ===
- Bar, M. (2004). "Visual objects in context". Nature Reviews Neuroscience. 5: 617–629. doi:10.1038/nrn1476.
- Bar, M.; Kassam, K.; Ghuman, A.; Boshyan, J.; Dale, A.; Hämäläinen, M.; Marinkovic, K.; Schacter, D.L.; Rosen, B.; Halgren, E. (2006). "Top-down facilitation of visual recognition". Proceedings of the National Academy of Sciences. 103 (2): 449–54. doi:10.1073/pnas.0507062103. PMC 1326160.
- Bar, M. (2007). "The Proactive Brain: Using analogies and associations to generate predictions". Trends in Cognitive Sciences. 11 (7): 280–289. doi:10.1016/j.tics.2007.05.005.

=== Books ===
- Bar, M., ed. (2011). Predictions in the Brain: Using Our Past to Generate a Future. New York: Oxford University Press. ISBN 978-0195395518.
- Bar, M.; Bubic, A. (2013). "Top-down Effects in Visual Perception". In Ochsner, K.; Kosslyn, S. (eds.). The Oxford Handbook of Cognitive Neuroscience. The Oxford Handbook Series. Oxford University Press. pp. 60–73. doi:10.1093/oxfordhb/9780199988693.013.0004. ISBN 9780190629878.
- Kveraga, K.; Bar, M. (2014). Scene Vision: Making Sense of What We See. Cambridge, Mass.: MIT Press. ISBN 9780262319898.
- Bar, M. (2022). Mindwandering: How Your Constant Mental Drift Can Improve Your Mood and Boost Your Creativity. Hachette Go. ISBN 9780306925306.
