= Agreement on Net Financial Assets =

The Agreement on Net Financial Assets (ANFA) is an agreement between European Central Bank (ECB) and EU countries national central banks (NCB) concerning the purchase of sovereign debt (financial assets) by the central banks.

By end of 2015 the total amount of such purchases had risen to around €560 billion. In a press conference on 3 December 2015, Mario Draghi, President of the ECB, declared that such purchases are "often (...) very hard to understand" but denied claims of any monetary financing by NCBs.

In the beginning, details of the treaty had not been published. Critics demanded the agreement to be disclosed. However, according to ECB this was not necessary because ANFA "is an internal technical document". Only on 5 February 2016, was the agreement published by the ECB along with an updated version of the questions and answers document.

Hans-Werner Sinn, the President of the Ifo Institute for Economic Research criticized that ANFA “allows states to print money in their own basement which is recognized as lawful money in other countries.”
