= Academy of Neuroscience for Architecture =

US nonprofit organization

The Academy of Neuroscience for Architecture (ANFA) is a nonprofit organization whose mission is to promote and advance knowledge that links neuroscience research to a growing understanding of human responses to the built environment.

== History ==
The Academy of Neuroscience for Architecture was founded in 2003 by the San Diego Chapter of the American Institute of Architects (AIA). A board of directors was established and an executive committee including John Paul Eberhard, ANFA's first president, was elected. During its infancy, from 2003 to 2005, the Academy of Neuroscience for Architecture was funded in part by a LaTrobe Fellowship awarded by the AIA's College of Fellows. Utilizing this money, President Eberhard conducted research relevant to ANFA's mission.

== Activities ==
Since its inception, the Academy of Neuroscience for Architecture, and the body of knowledge connecting neuroscience and architecture, has grown substantially. The work of ANFA has been noted in numerous publications and broadcasts including: AIArchitect, A & E Perspectives, Architectural Record, BrainWork, Cerebrum, Engineering News Record, Inside Knowledge, the International Interior Design Association's Perspective, Interiors & Sources, The National Institute of Building Sciences' Whole Building Design Guide, National Public Radio's Science Friday, Scientific American, and the Washington Business Journal among others.

Currently, ANFA's board of directors is composed of 17 renowned neuroscientists and architects from all around the United States of America. ANFA strives to foster collaboration among neuroscientists and architects to explore, through scientific methods, the range of human experiences with elements of architecture, to organize and validate the information that results from this collaboration and to disseminate it to emerging professionals, and students. The members of the Board of Directors actively spread awareness of the intersection of these disciplines through a variety of means including: lectures, publications, workshops, and teaching college-level courses. The Academy of Neuroscience for Architecture also supports the efforts of several Research Associates, whose studies are relevant to ANFA's mission.

== See also ==
- Conscious city
