= Amos Rapoport =

American architect (1929–2026)

Amos Rapoport (28 March 1929 – 29 September 2026) was a Polish-American architect and academic who was one of the founders of Environment-Behavior Studies (EBS). He authored over 200 academic publications in this field, including books that have been translated into foreign languages, including French, Spanish, German, Persian, Japanese, Korean and Chinese. Rapoport held honorable and visiting positions in many universities around the globe, and was professor emeritus at the University of Wisconsin-Milwaukee.

His work focused mainly on the role of cultural variables, cross-cultural studies, and theory development and synthesis. Rapoport's influential book House Form and Culture explores how culture, human behavior, and the environment affect house form.

== Background ==
Rapoport was born in Warsaw, Poland on 28 March 1929. In 1939, he and his parents fled Warsaw and after crossing the USSR, they found refuge in Shanghai, where they spent the war in the Japanese-controlled ghetto. Amos attended the Shanghai Jewish School. Following the Japanese surrender, he emigrated to Australia, where, in 1947, the family settled in Melbourne. In 1955 he graduated with a Bachelor of Architecture degree from the University of Melbourne. In 1957 he graduated with an MA from Rice University.

Rapoport died on 29 September 2026, at the age of 97.

== Academic career ==
Rapoport taught at the University of Melbourne, University of California, Berkeley, University College London and University of Sydney. From 1972 until his retirement in 2001 he taught at the University of Wisconsin–Milwaukee where he was a Distinguished Professor in the School of Architecture and Urban Planning. His main aim was to define the importance of culture in the built environment and architecture, this is especially highlighted in his 1969 book House Form and Culture. He also held visiting appointments in Argentina, Australia, Brazil, Canada, Israel, Mexico, Puerto Rico, India, Switzerland, Turkey and the U.K., among other places.

== Books ==
- 1969 – House Form and Culture
- 1976 – The Mutual Interaction of People and Their Built Environment. A Cross-Cultural Perspective.
- 1977 – Human Aspects of Urban Form: Towards a Man-Environment Approach to Urban Form and Design
- 1982 – The Meaning of the Built Environment: A Nonverbal Communication Approach
- 1990 – History and Precedent in Environmental Design
- 2003 – Culture, Architecture, and Design
