= Anfa (arrondissement) =

Anfa أنفا
- Arrondissement of Casablanca
- Interactive map of Anfa
- Coordinates: 33°35′02″N 7°39′44″W
- Country: Morocco
- Region: Casablanca-Settat
- Prefecture: Casablanca
- District: Anfa

Government
  - Borough President: Mohamed Chabak (محمد الشباك).

Population (2024)
  - Total: 66 202
- Time zone: UTC+0 (GMT)

Anfa (Arabic: أنفا, romanized: Anfā) is one of the 16 boroughs of Casablanca, the largest city of Morocco. It includes the popular seaside neighborhood of Ain Diab.

As of 2024, it has 66 202 habitants.

The current President of this district is Mohamed Chabak (محمد الشباك).

== Borough ==
=== Management ===
The headquarters of the Anfa borough is located at the intersection of Skhirat and Ain Atiq streets. The elected members of the borough are required to meet 3 times a year, during the first week of January, the first week of June, and the first week of September.

=== Liste of current representatives ===
The Anfa district council has 17 elected members.

Since the local elections of September 8, 2021, the President of the Anfa district is Mohamed Chabak (محمد شباك) from the RNI Party. He is also a member of parliament.

Mohamed Chabak	محمد شباك	Président of the Anfa borough Member of parliament
Oumaima El Idrissi	اميمة الادريسي	Member of the Anfa borough
Hassan Chemsi	حسن شمسي	Member of the Anfa borough
	نادية توقة	Member of the Anfa borough
	محمد سليمي	Member of the Anfa borough
	فدوى رضواني	Member of the Anfa borough
Zakaria Fadil	زكرياء فضيل	Member of the Anfa borough
Saïd Al Chrami	سعيد الشرامي	Member of the Anfa borough
	السعدية بيض	Member of the Anfa borough
	ادريس صبري	Member of the Anfa borough
	خديجة رجاء	Member of the Anfa borough
Mohamed Ali Benjelloun	محمد علي بنجلون وجدي	Member of the Anfa borough
Malika Mezzour	مليكة مزور	Member of the Anfa borough
	فاطمة البوهتاني	Member of the Anfa borough
Redouane Lahlayssi	رضوان لحلايسي	Member of the Anfa borough

During the local elections of September 8, 2021, Mohamed Chabak's RNI list obtained 47% of the vote, which gave it 7 seats.

List	List Leader	% of Votes Obtained	Seats Won
RNI	Mohamed Chabak	47,63	7
Istiqlal	Saïd Al Chrami	17,19	4
PAM	Mohamed Ali Benjelloun	9,48	3
The Neo-Democrats	Redouane Lahlayssi	5,07	1

The other lists (PJD, FGD, USFP, Haraki, UC, Freedom Party) failed to obtain enough votes in the elections to secure a seat on the borough council.

=== Former elections ===
==== 2015 local elections ====
During the 2015 local moroccan elections, Yasmina Baddou, head of the Istiqlal list, was re-elected president of the district.
