= List of sites and monuments in Morocco =

This is a list of the national sites and monuments of cultural and historic value that are indexed by the Moroccan ministry of culture.

The ministry classified the national sites and monuments in Morocco into two different lists. One list for monuments and another one for buildings.

City	List of monuments
Agadir	List of monuments in Agadir
Asilah	List of monuments in Asilah
Azilal	List of monuments in Azilal
Casablanca	List of monuments in Casablanca
Chefchaouen	List of monuments in Chefchaouen
El Hajeb	List of monuments in El Hajeb
El Jadida	List of monuments in El Jadida
Errachidia	List of monuments in Errachidia
Essaouira	List of monuments in Essaouira
Fez	List of monuments in Fez
Figuig	List of monuments in Figuig
Guelmim	List of monuments in Guelmim
Marrakesh	List of monuments in Marrakesh
Meknes	List of monuments in Meknes
Mehdya	List of monuments in Mehdya
Nador	List of monuments in Nador
Ouarzazate	List of monuments in Ouarzazate
Oujda	List of monuments in Oujda
Rabat	List of monuments in Rabat
Safi	List of monuments in Safi
Salé	List of monuments in Salé
Sidi Kacem	List of monuments in Sidi Kacem
Sidi Ifni	List of monuments in Sidi Ifni
Tangier	List of monuments in Tangier
Taroudant	List of monuments in Taroudant
Tata	List of monuments in Tata
Taza	List of monuments in Taza
Tetouan	List of monuments in Tetouan
Tiznit	List of monuments in Tiznit
Zagora	List of monuments in Zagora

== See also ==
- List of museums in Morocco
