= List of monuments in El Jadida =

This is a list of monuments that are classified by the Moroccan ministry of culture around El Jadida.

== Monuments and sites in El Jadida ==
Image		Name	Location	Coordinates	Identifier
	Upload Photo	Sidi Bou Afi Lighthouse	El Jadida	33°15'1"N, 8°31'1"W	pc_architecture/sanae:350019
	Upload Photo	Mazagan	El Jadida	33°15'23.62"N, 8°30'8.91"W	pc_architecture/sanae:410019
	Upload Photo	Portuguese cistern	El Jadida	33°15'24.239"N, 8°30'9.857"W	pc_architecture/sanae:070004
	Upload Photo	Church of Our Lady of Light	El Jadida		pc_architecture/sanae:100002
	Upload Photo	Church of the Assumption	El Jadida	33°15'23.033"N, 8°30'10.465"W	pc_architecture/sanae:100001
	Upload Photo	Saint Sebastian Church	El Jadida		pc_architecture/sanae:100003
	Upload Photo	Medina of El Jadida	El Jadida Province	33°15'35.899"N, 8°30'34.474"W	pc_architecture/sanae:280020
	Upload Photo	Moulay Abdallah Minaret	El Jadida	33°11'52.660"N, 8°35'21.095"W	pc_architecture/sanae:290003
	Upload Photo	Tit old minaret	El Jadida	33°15'4.316"N, 8°30'5.566"W	pc_architecture/sanae:290004
	Upload Photo	Saint Anthony Bastion	El Jadida	33°15'25.556"N, 8°30'15.880"W	pc_architecture/sanae:050020
	Upload Photo	Ancient Portuguese citadel	El Jadida	33°15'23.17817"N, 8°30'9.92362"W	pc_architecture/sanae:070003
	Upload Photo	Bastion of the Angel	El Jadida	33°15'31"N, 8°29'50"W	pc_architecture/sanae:050021
	Upload Photo	Door of the oxen	El Jadida	33°15'7.049"N, 8°30'6.430"W	pc_architecture/sanae:390053
	Upload Photo	Main Door of El Jadida	El Jadida	33°15'1.127"N, 8°31'0.307"W	pc_architecture/sanae:390054
	Upload Photo	Ribat Tit	El Jadida	33°15'4.180"N, 8°30'5.670"W	pc_architecture/sanae:420001
	Upload Photo	Bastion of Holy Spirit	El Jadida	33°15'19.897"N, 8°30'11.804"W	pc_architecture/sanae:050022
	Upload Photo	Sidi Smail	El Jadida Province	32°49'N, 8°30'W	pc_architecture/sanae:260263
	Upload Photo	Kasbah Boulaouane	Boulaouane	32°51'24.721"N, 8°1'13.451"W	pc_architecture/sanae:190061
	Upload Photo	Enclosure of Kasba Boulaouane	Boulaouane	32°51'24.721"N, 8°1'13.451"W	pc_architecture/sanae:410053
	Upload Photo	Walls of Boulaouane Kasbah	Boulaouane	32°51'24.001"N, 8°1'11.510"W	pc_architecture/sanae:190007
	Upload Photo	Oualidia Kasbah	Oualidia	32°44'28.097"N, 9°1'20.899"W	pc_architecture/sanae:190013
	Upload Photo	Kasbah Dar Baroud	Azemmour	33°17'33.929"N, 8°20'28.658"W	pc_architecture/sanae:190052
	Upload Photo	Sidi Ali	Azemmour		pc_architecture/sanae:260282
	Upload Photo	Medina of Azemmour	Azemmour	33°17'28.108"N, 8°20'30.538"W	pc_architecture/sanae:280016
