= Mzoura =

Mzoura may refer to the following places:

- Msoura, Morocco
- Mzoura, Settat Province, a commune of Morocco
