= List of monuments in Salé, Morocco =

This is a list of monuments that are classified by the Moroccan ministry of culture around Salé.

== Monuments and sites in Salé ==
Image		Name	Location	Coordinates	Identifier
	Upload Photo	Bab el-Mrissa	Salé	34°1'57.75"N, 6°49'12.67"W	pc_architecture/sanae:390017
	Upload Photo	Enclosure of the Medina of Salé	Salé	34°2'1.165"N, 6°49'12.983"W	pc_architecture/sanae:410021
	Upload Photo	Kasbah of Gnaouas	Salé	34°3'44"N, 6°48'48"W	pc_architecture/sanae:190017
	Upload Photo	Madrasa Bou Inaniya	Salé	34°2'24"N, 6°49'12"W	pc_architecture/sanae:110002
	Upload Photo	Marinid Madrasa of Salé	Salé	34°2'23.5"N, 6°49'38.1"W	pc_architecture/sanae:270008
	Upload Photo	Aqueduct Sour El Kuas	Salé	34°2'51.670"N, 6°48'58.558"W	pc_architecture/sanae:030001
	Upload Photo	Bab Bouhaja	Salé	34°2'6.983"N, 6°49'25.903"W	pc_architecture/sanae:390018
	Upload Photo	Foundouk Cherkaoui	Salé		pc_architecture/sanae:110156
	Upload Photo	Sidi Massoud	Salé		pc_architecture/sanae:260487
	Upload Photo	Bab Lakhmis (Salé)	Salé	34°2'11.288"N, 6°49'4.444"W	pc_architecture/sanae:390016
	Upload Photo	Borj El kébir	Salé	34°2'47.89126"N, 6°49'42.94664"W	pc_architecture/sanae:050003
	Upload Photo	Salé church	Salé	34°1'57.166"N, 6°49'33.089"W	pc_architecture/sanae:100014
	Upload Photo	Dar Sbihi garden	Salé		pc_architecture/sanae:180044
	Upload Photo	Medina of Salé	Salé	34°2'25.991"N, 6°49'26.760"W	pc_architecture/sanae:280003
	Upload Photo	Minaret of Bourmada mosque	Salé	34°2'15.025"N, 6°49'19.621"W	pc_architecture/sanae:290002
	Upload Photo	Bab Chaafa	Salé	34°2'38.252"N, 6°49'30.486"W	pc_architecture/sanae:390013
	Upload Photo	Bab Jdid	Salé	34°2'11.404"N, 6°49'36.329"W	pc_architecture/sanae:390109
	Upload Photo	Bab Maalka	Salé	34°2'12.142"N, 6°49'37.690"W	pc_architecture/sanae:390020
	Upload Photo	Bab Sebta	Salé	34°2'29.774"N, 6°49'15.431"W	pc_architecture/sanae:390014
	Upload Photo	Bab Ferth	Salé	34°2'24.137"N, 6°49'8.090"W	pc_architecture/sanae:390015
	Upload Photo	Sqala Jdida	Salé	34°2'4.855"N, 6°49'43.136"W	pc_architecture/idpcm:815A4B
	Upload Photo	Mausoleum Sidi Moussa	Salé	34°3'34.934"N, 6°49'3.076"W	pc_architecture/idpcm:978112
	Upload Photo	Borj El Quedim	Salé	34°2'28.370"N, 6°50'0.190"W	pc_architecture/sanae:050005
	Upload Photo	Borj El Mellah	Salé	34°2'4.326"N, 6°49'12.011"W	pc_architecture/sanae:050004
	Upload Photo	Borj Adoumoue	Salé	34°2'27"N, 6°49'48"W	pc_architecture/idpcm:847E51
	Upload Photo	Borj El Jedid	Salé	34°2'28.370"N, 6°50'0.190"W	pc_architecture/sanae:050006
	Upload Photo	Bouknadel Gardens	Bouknadel	34°5'42.7758"N, 6°45'59.5822"W	pc_architecture/sanae:180013
	Upload Photo	Bab Dar Assinaa	Salé	34°1'59.851"N, 6°49'17.810"W	pc_architecture/idpcm:1C84
	Upload Photo	Salé Kissaria	Salé	34°2'15.824"N, 6°49'27.660"W	pc_architecture/sanae:210001
