= List of monuments in Casablanca =

This is a list of monuments that are classified by the Moroccan ministry of culture around Casablanca.

== Monuments and sites in Casablanca ==
Image		Name	Location	Coordinates	Identifier
	Upload Photo	Casablanca Cathedral	Casablanca	33°35'28"N, 7°37'28"W	pc_architecture/sanae:100015
	Upload Photo	El Hank Lighthouse	Casablanca	33°36'35.71"N, 7°39'16.81"W	pc_architecture/sanae:350011
	Upload Photo	Notre-Dame-de-Lourdes Church	Casablanca	33°34'57.5"N, 7°36'56.8"W	pc_architecture/sanae:100038
	Upload Photo	Arab League Park of Casablanca	Casablanca	33°35'15.846"N, 7°37'28.668"W	pc_architecture/sanae:180036
	Upload Photo	Isesco Park	Casablanca	33°34'45.988"N, 7°36'47.722"W	pc_architecture/sanae:180084
	Upload Photo	Enclosure of Sour Jdid	Casablanca	33°36'16.319"N, 7°37'56.658"W	pc_architecture/sanae:410025
	Upload Photo	Hermitage Park	Casablanca	33°33'51.394"N, 7°36'48.316"W	pc_architecture/sanae:180078
	Upload Photo	Sindibad Park	Casablanca	33°34'56.442"N, 7°41'39.890"W	pc_architecture/sanae:180079
	Upload Photo	Kasbah Mansouria	El Mansouria	33°45'4.352"N, 7°17'37.421"W	pc_architecture/sanae:190047
