= List of monuments in Sidi Ifni =

This is a list of monuments that are classified by the Moroccan ministry of culture around Sidi Ifni.

== Monuments and sites in Sidi Ifni ==
Image		Name	Location	Coordinates	Identifier
	Upload Photo	Lbarkou	Sidi Ifni		pc_architecture/idpcm:BF6250
	Upload Photo	Adadir-n-Dou Lhaj	Sidi Ifni		pc_architecture/sanae:010258
	Upload Photo	Old Spanish Consulate, Sidi Ifni	Sidi Ifni	29°22'53.353"N, 10°10'33.449"W	pc_architecture/idpcm:716B
