= Msoura =

Msoura Dolmen
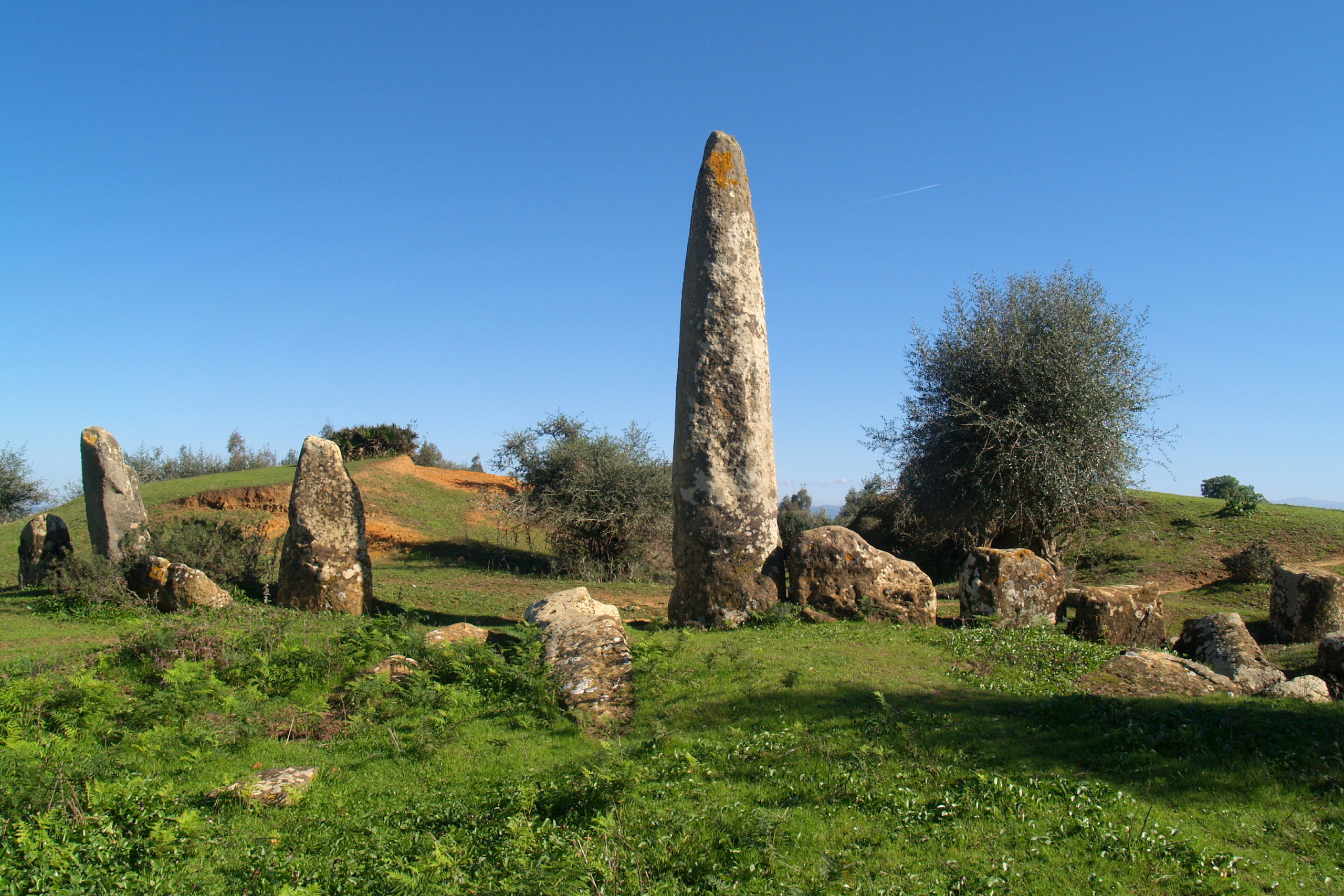
- Location: M'soura
- Coordinates: 35.4042°N 5.9439°W
- Height: 118 m

Msoura (also Mzoura, Mezora, Mçora, M'Zorah, M'Sora or Mzora) is an archaeological site of a stone circle in northern Morocco. It is located near Chouahed village, 15 kilometers southeast of Asilah, and consists of 167 monoliths surrounding a tumulus 58 m long, 54 m wide, with a height of 6 m. One of the monoliths, known as El Uted (the peg) measures more than 5 m, with the average height of the monoliths being 1.5 m. Legend claims it is the tomb of the giant Antaeus. Dated to the 4th or 3rd century BC, the site probably hints to the beginnings of the Kingdom of Mauretania.

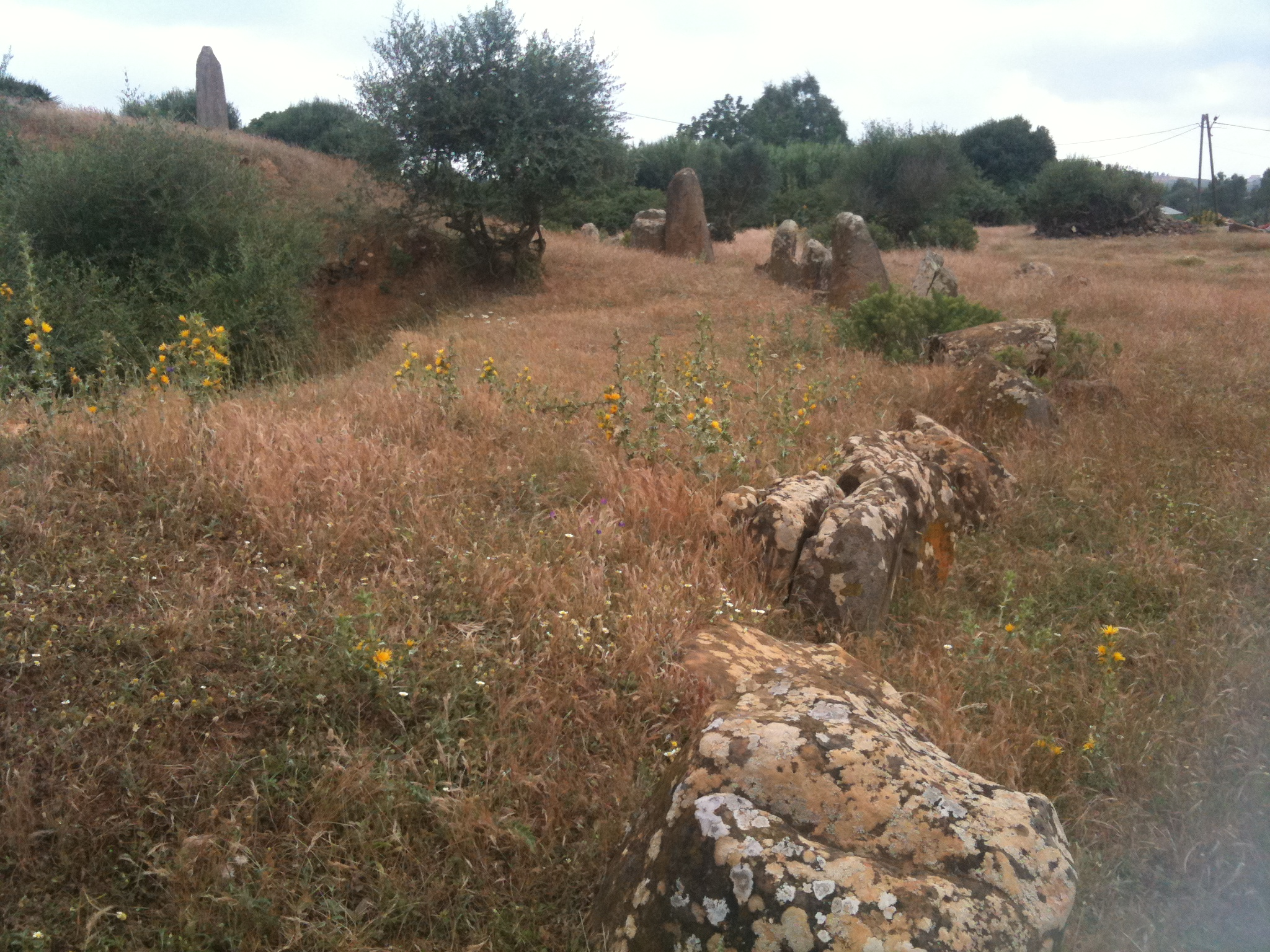
Mzoura stone circle

On 27 January 2025, the Moroccan Ministry of Culture added the site of Mzoura to the list of national heritage sites.

== History ==
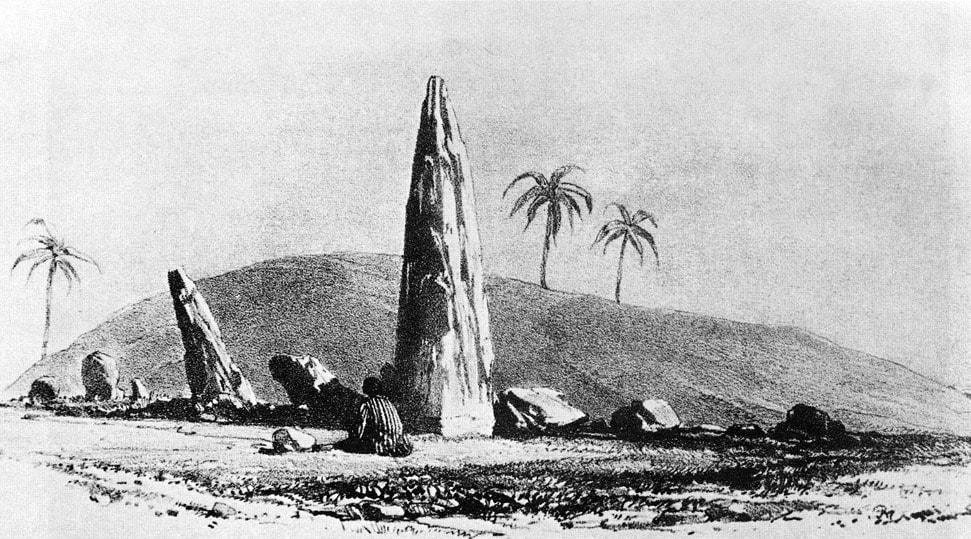
A hand-drawn sketch of the Mzoura cromlech by Sir Arthur Coppel de Brooke

Located around 50 km (31 mi) away from Tangier, Morocco (ancient Tingis), it is possible that the Mzoura burial site is the same one that Roman general Quintus Sertorius had been shown by locals, during a visit to the Kingdom of Mauretania in 82 BCE. Sertorius, according to a legend narrated by Greek-Roman biographer Lucius Plutarch, excavated the tomb and found the body of the giant Antaeus, son of Gaia and Uranus, buried there. Antaeus (or Anti in Tamazight) is also known to Greek mythology through the 12 Labors of Heracles as Heracles killed Antaeus. Dumbfounded, Sertorius had performed a sacrifice, refilled the tomb, and joined a local ritual of veneration then.

This story, despite being apocryphal, at least in some of its details, confirms two things: first, that Ancient North Africans engaged in ancestor worship, since there are many similar burial mounds throughout North Africa. Secondly, that the person buried there was an important tribal war chief or ruler.

The monument was probably not mentioned or hinted at in any known ancient texts other than the aforementioned indirect hint in Plutarch's Parallel Lives. In 1831, it drew the attention of the British adventurer Arthur de Capell Brooke who mentioned it in his book Sketches in Spain and Morocco with an illustration. In 1846, it was mentioned by French author and geologist Émilien Renou in his book Description Géographique de L'Empire de Maroc. In 1875, French geologist and biologist Gustave-Marie Bleicher gave the first complete description of the tumulus of Mzoura, and in 1932, Franciscan priest Henry Koehler described the monoliths around it.

== Excavation ==
Spanish archaeologist César Luis de Montalban started excavating the site in 1935. His work however was interrupted when he was arrested during the Spanish Civil War, and he never published his findings. It is expected that the site would have contained burial and funerary chambers, just like the ones that were found at the burial mounds in Sidi Slimane and Sidi Allal el Bahraoui, Morocco.

Miquel Tarradell excavated what was left of the site in the 1950s. He also discovered another smaller stone ring with 16 monoliths nearby. Earlier surveys had suggested that Mzoura stone ring was somehow linked to the civilizations that built Stonehenge and similar structures in Europe. This hypothesis was however rejected by Tarradell, and later also by Gabriel Camps, who both concluded the mound and its stone ring were built as a burial site for a Mauri chief or king by locals using local knowledge.

Based on the dating of amphora found in the mound, the site was dated approximately to the 4th or 3rd century BC. The conclusion drawn by Camps and others is that Mzoura cromlech and similar monuments are the vestiges of the emergence process of a powerful confederation or kingdom northwest of Morocco.

== Current state ==
The botched up excavation made by De Montalban damaged the site, and left an X-scar on its surface visible until today.
