= Abu Shuayb =

Abu Shuayb Ayub Ibn Said Erredad al-Sanhaji Assariya (Arabic: أبو شعيب أيوب بن سعيد الصنهاجي) (French transliteration Abou Chouaib) (died 1176–7) is the patron saint of Azemmour, Morocco. His brotherhood is called the Shuaybiya.
