= Kasbah Boulaouane =

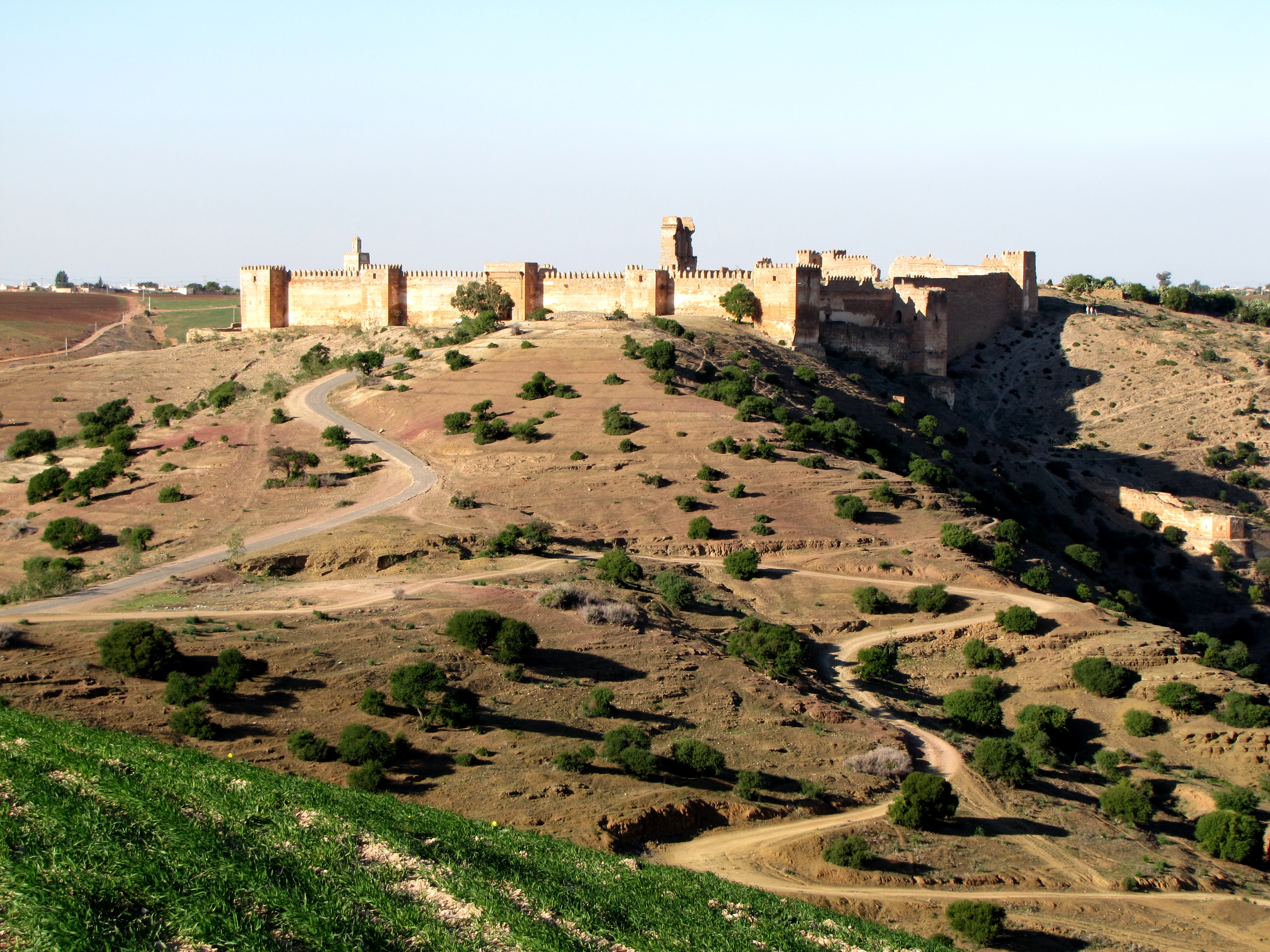
Kasbah Boulaouane

Kasbah Boulaouane (Arabic: قصبة بولعوان) is a kasbah in the town of Boulaouane, Morocco. It is situated on the rock which sits at the curve of Oum Er-Rbia River, overlooking the surrounding area. In the 20th century, an orientalist Edmond Doutté had provided a detailed description for the kasbah.

== History ==
Kasbah Boulaouane was commissioned around 1710. It is considered among tens of other kasbahs built during the era of the Alaouite sultan Ismail Ibn Sharif as a local center for administration. The kasbah is placed on the strategic location which overlooks the river, and reachable through the strategic corridor known as Al-Kurrasa. The building is modeled after the similar fortification built during the Byzantine-era. There had been a long tradition among the Maghrebi dynasties such Almoravid, Almohad, Marinid and Saadi to construct kasbahs as fortifications, and this is considered another addition by the Alaouite Sultan.

The kasbah was abandoned later, and covered by the sand. The accumulation of sand reached the same height as the kasbah wall, and it took intensive removal of the sand to restore some of the facilities such as mosque inside the kasbah. The restoration has been conducted along with the overhauling of the surrounding area into a tourist spot, by arranging the infrastructure.

== Gallery ==
Kasbah Boulaouane

The staircase leading into the kasbah

Women visiting the interior

The ruins

The ruins

The Oum Er-Rbia River seen from the kasbah

The Oum Er-Rbia River and its meanders seen from the kasbah

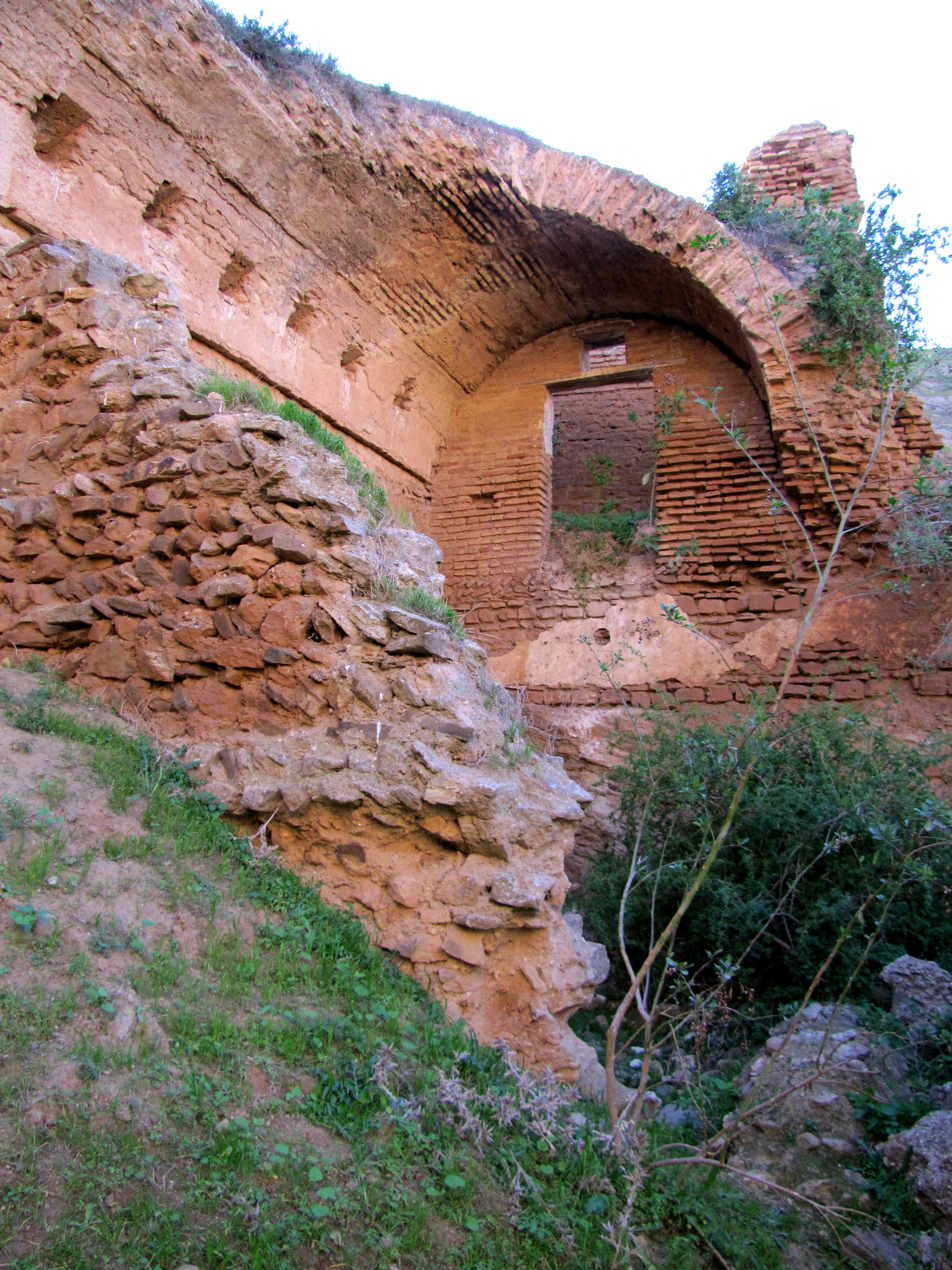
The kasbah's ruins up close
