= Notre-Dame de Lourdes Church (Casablanca) =

- Église Notre-Dame-de-Lourdes de Casablanca
- Notre-Dame de Lourdes Church
- 33°34′57.9″N 7°36′56.9″W
- Address: Casablanca
- Country: Morocco
- Denomination: Roman Catholic

History
- Status: Church
- Founded: 1954

Architecture
- Architect: Achille Dangleterre
- Architectural type: Church
- Style: Modern

Notre-Dame de Lourdes Church (French: Église Notre-Dame-de-Lourdes de Casablanca) is a Roman Catholic church in modernist style in Casablanca, Morocco. It was built in 1954 by architect Achille Dangleterre and engineer Gaston Zimmer.

== Stained glass ==
The main attraction of Notre-Dame de Lourdes church is the glasswork of world-famous stained glass artist Gabriel Loire. Its long concrete entrance is also noteworthy.

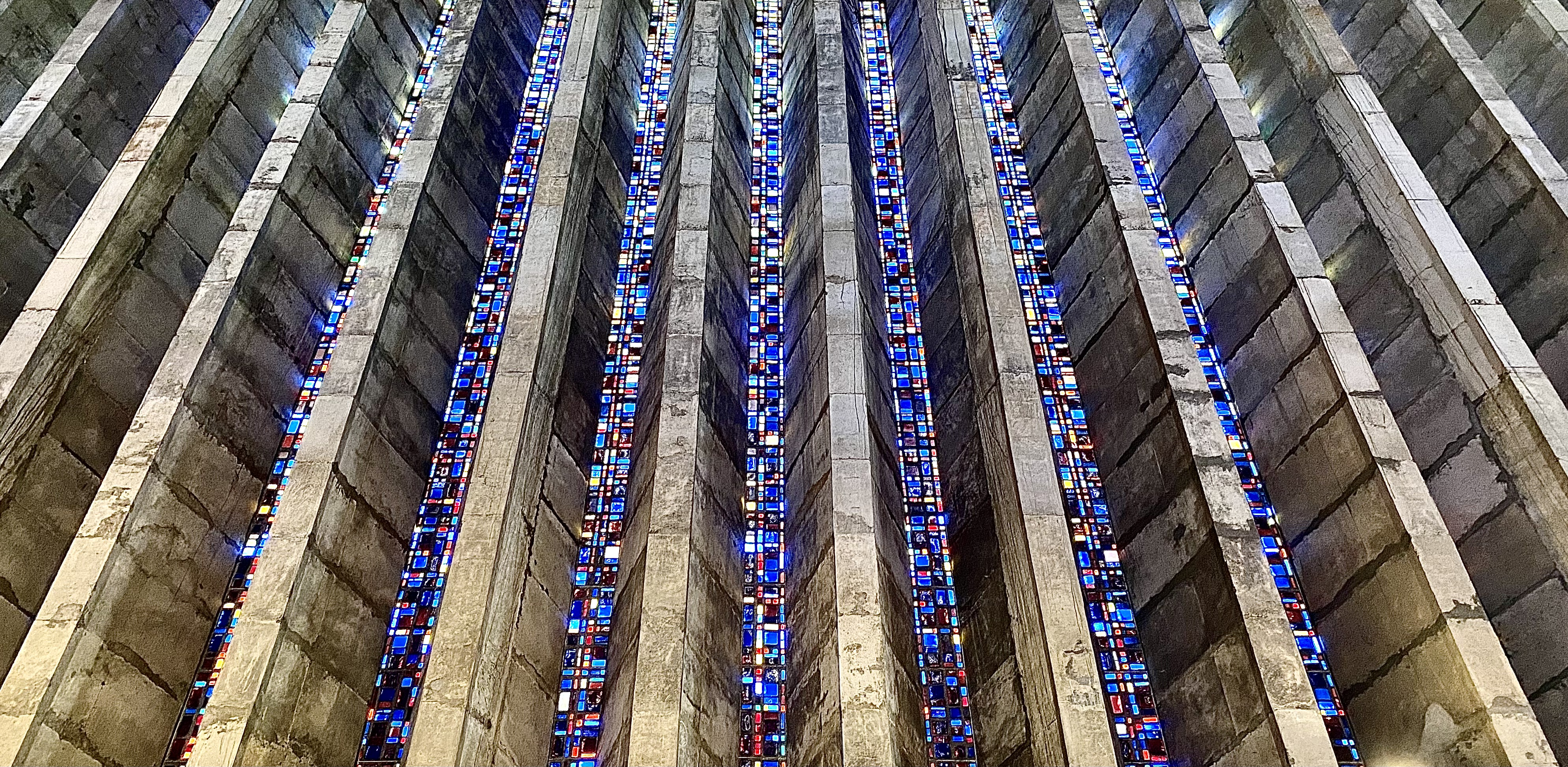
Clerestory windows, south side.

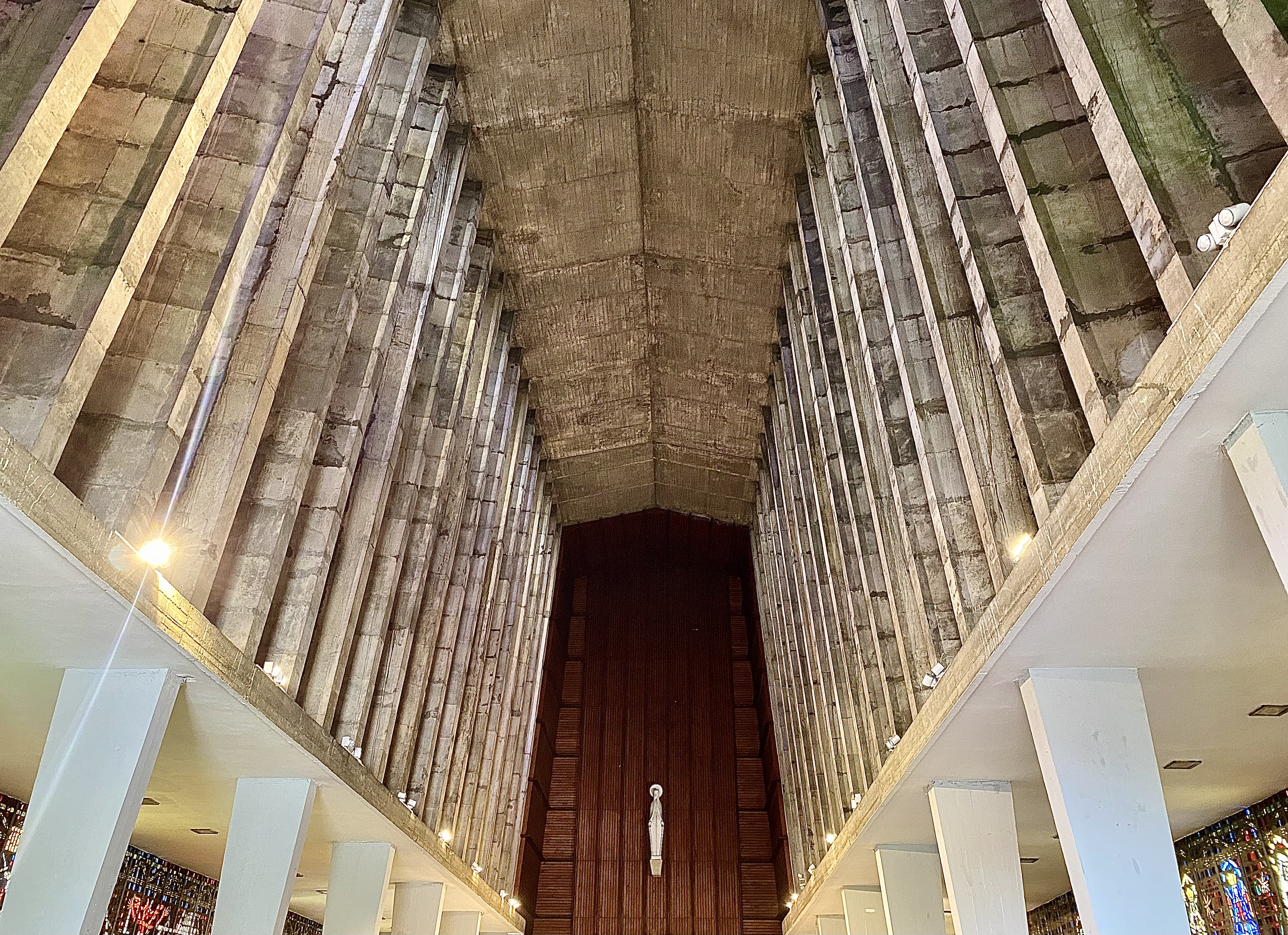
Vaulted concrete ceiling.
