= List of monuments in Nador, Morocco =

This is a list of monuments that are classified by the Moroccan ministry of culture around Nador.

== Monuments and sites in Nador ==
Image		Name	Location	Coordinates	Identifier
	Upload Photo	Cape Three Forks Lighthouse	Nador	35°26'16.469"N, 2°57'46.159"W	pc_architecture/sanae:350005
	Upload Photo	Ras Lma lighthouse	Ras el Ma	35°8'48.65"N, 2°25'31.55"W	pc_architecture/sanae:350004
	Upload Photo	Saint-Jacques-le-Majeur church	Nador	35°10'50.650"N, 2°55'37.682"W	pc_architecture/sanae:100026
