= Boulaouane =

- Rural commune and town
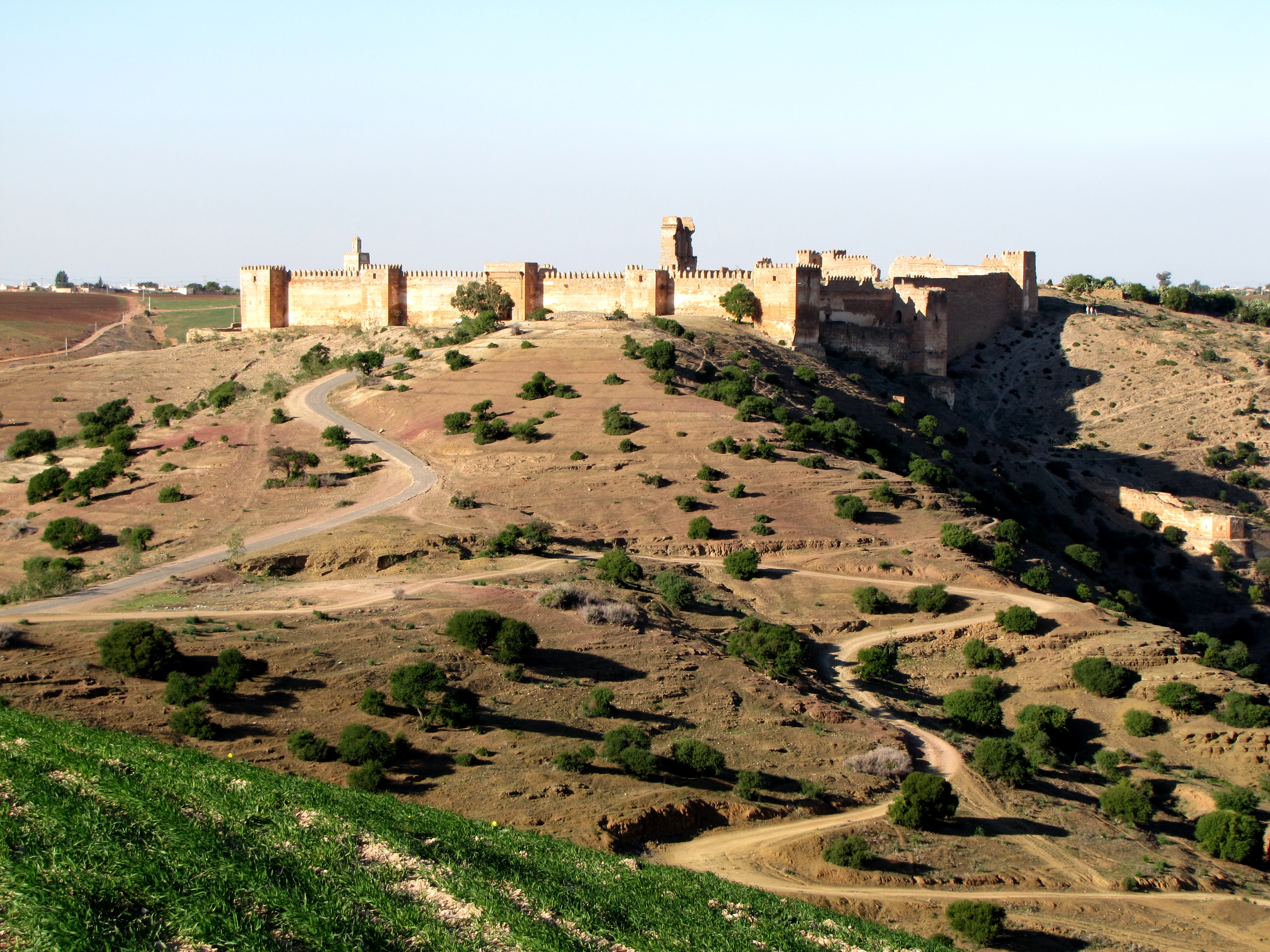
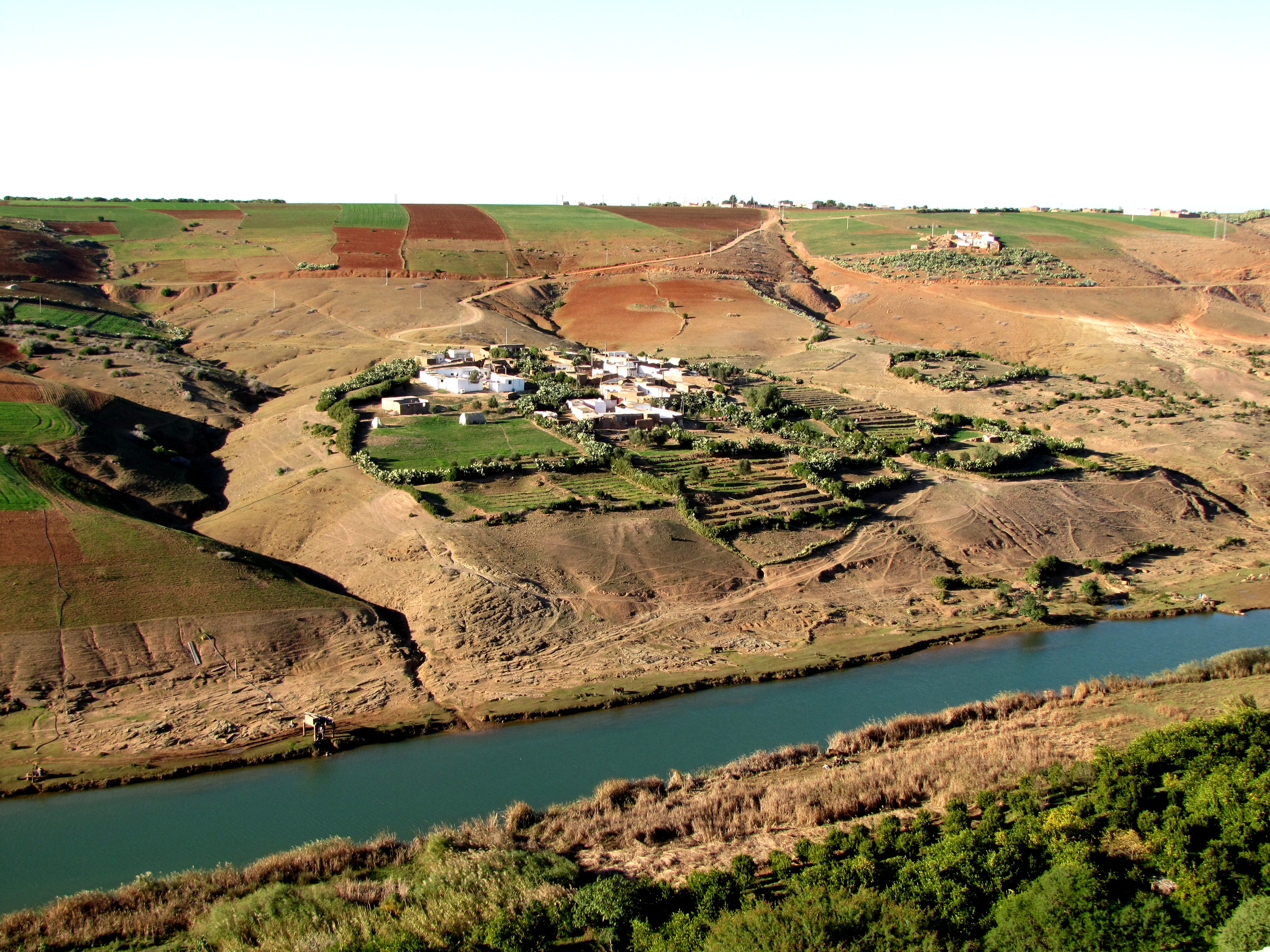
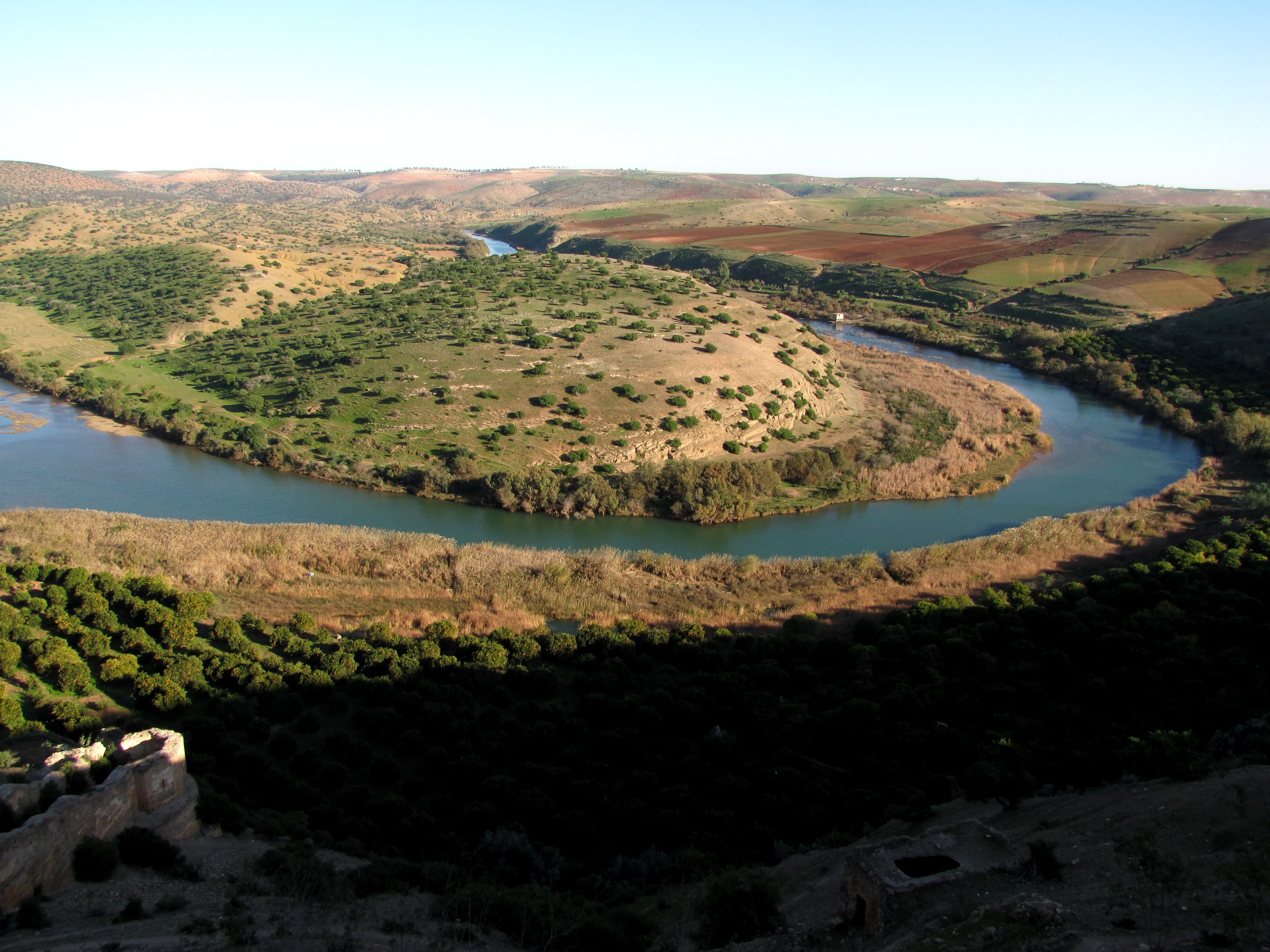
- The Kasbah
- Interactive map of Boulaouane
- Coordinates: 32.86066°N 8.05303°W
- Country: Morocco
- Region: Casablanca-Settat
- Province: El Jadida

Population (2004)
  - Total: 14,404
- Time zone: UTC+0 (GMT)

Boulaouane is a small town and rural commune in El Jadida Province of the Casablanca-Settat region of Morocco. The town is near the Oum Er-Rbia River and the fortress (Boulanouane Kasbah) overlooks that river. At the time of the 2004 census, the commune had a total population of 14,404 people living in 2319 households.

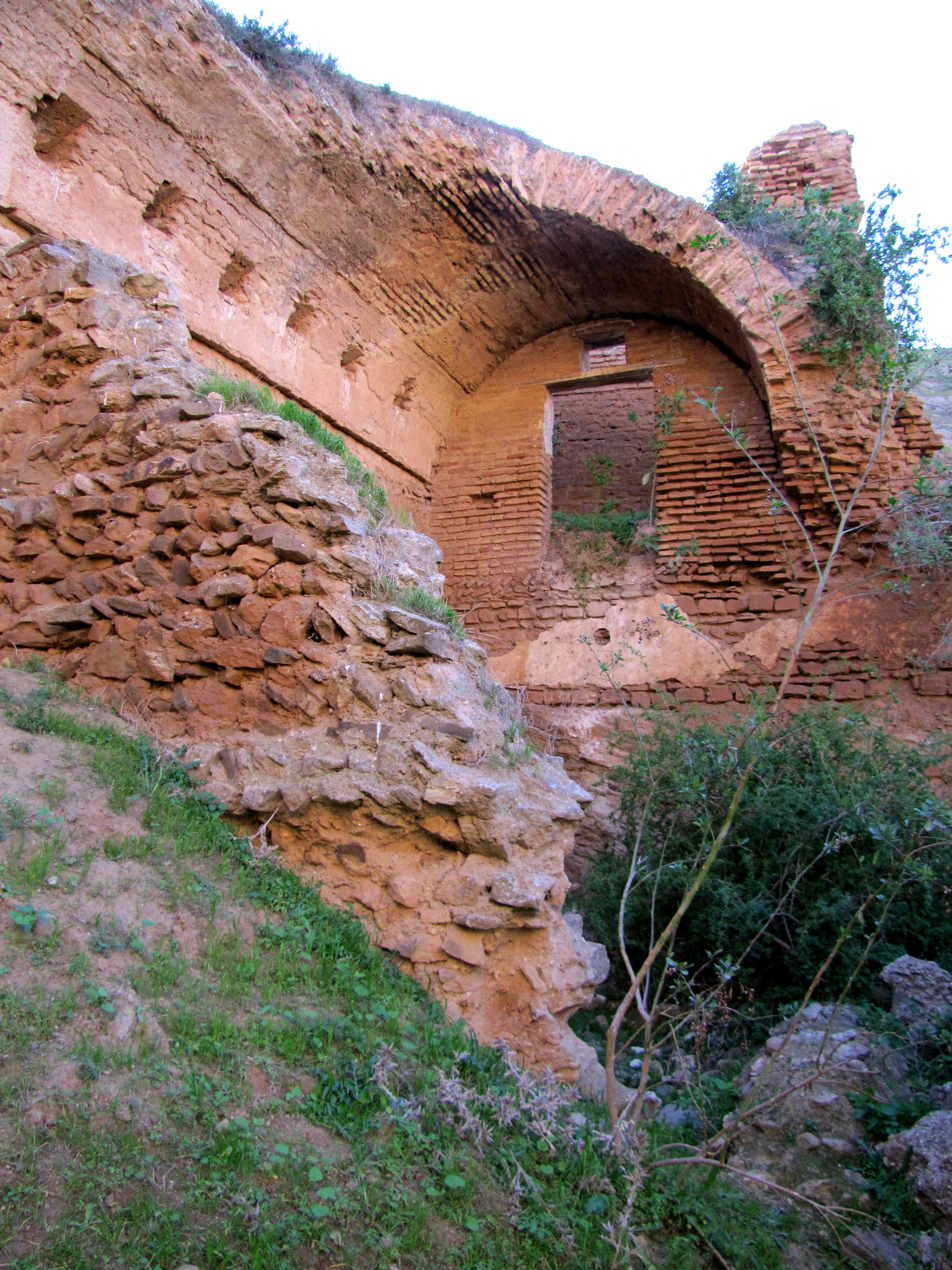
The kasbah's ruins up close

== History ==
The fortress or Kasbah that overlooks an important bend in the river was built by Moulay Ismail in 1710. The ten-metre-high (33 ft) towers command a view of the surrounding area.
