= List of monuments in Mehdya =

This is a list of monuments that are classified by the Moroccan ministry of culture around Mehdya.

== Monuments and sites in Mehdya ==
Image		Name	Location	Coordinates	Identifier
	Upload Photo	Mehdia Lighthouse	Mehdya	34°16'0"N, 6°40'0"W	pc_architecture/sanae:350010
	Upload Photo	Kasbah of Mehdia	Mehdya	34°15'51.001"N, 6°39'27.000"W	pc_architecture/sanae:190012
	Upload Photo	Walls of Mehdia Kasbah	Mehdya	34°15'55.026"N, 6°39'33.257"W	pc_architecture/sanae:410052
	Upload Photo	Bab El Aïn	Mehdya	34°15'44.071"N, 6°33'57.481"W	pc_architecture/sanae:390090
	Upload Photo	Bab Jdid	Mehdya	34°15'51.023"N, 6°39'24.646"W	pc_architecture/sanae:390089
