= List of monuments and sites in Errachidia =

This is a list of monuments that are classified or inventoried by the Moroccan ministry of culture around Errachidia.

== Monuments and sites in Errachidia ==
Image		Name	Location	Coordinates	Identifier
	Upload Photo	Ksar of Asrir	Chorfa M'Daghra	31°53'28"N, 4°22'20"W	pc_architecture/sanae:220032
	Upload Photo	Ksar of El Maadid	Aarab Sebbah Ziz	31°28'0.188"N, 4°12'55.033"W	pc_architecture/sanae:220035
	Upload Photo	Ksar of Sidi Bou Abdellah	Chorfa M'Daghra	31°54'0"N, 4°23'0"W	pc_architecture/sanae:220020
	Upload Photo	Ksar of Tabouassamt	Es-Sfalat	31°14'22.078"N, 4°16'29.273"W	pc_architecture/sanae:220042
