= List of monuments in Asilah =

This is a list of monuments that are classified by the Moroccan ministry of culture around Asilah.

== Monuments and sites in Asilah ==
Image		Name	Location	Coordinates	Identifier
	Upload Photo	Ribat Arzila	Asilah	35°27'57.917"N, 6°2'15.936"W	pc_architecture/sanae:420003
	Upload Photo	Medina of Asilah	Asilah	35°27'54.918"N, 6°2'23.842"W	pc_architecture/sanae:410030
	Upload Photo	Bab Homar	Asilah	35°27'54.014"N, 6°2'16.436"W	pc_architecture/sanae:390077
