= List of monuments in Tiznit =

This is a list of monuments that are classified by the Moroccan ministry of culture around Tiznit.

== Monuments and sites in Tiznit ==
| Image | | Name | Location | Coordinates | Identifier |
|---|---|---|---|---|---|
| | Upload Photo | Borj of Tiznit | Tiznit | 29°42'1.886"N, 9°43'36.692"W | pc_architecture/sanae:050002 |
| | Upload Photo | Remparts of Tiznit | Tiznit | 29°42'15.653"N, 9°43'41.610"W | pc_architecture/sanae:410016 |
| | Upload Photo | Medina of Tiznit | Tiznit | 29°41'58.618"N, 9°43'33.672"W | pc_architecture/sanae:280007 |
| | Upload Photo | Aglou Medersa | Tnine Aglou | | pc_architecture/sanae:270028 |
| | Upload Photo | Assif El-Kbalt | Tafraout | | pc_architecture/sanae:150149 |
| | Upload Photo | Jebel Tafraout | Tafraout | 29°43'29.910"N, 8°58'33.211"W | |
