= Kasbah Gnawa =

Moroccan cultural heritage site

- قصبة ڭناوة (Arabic)
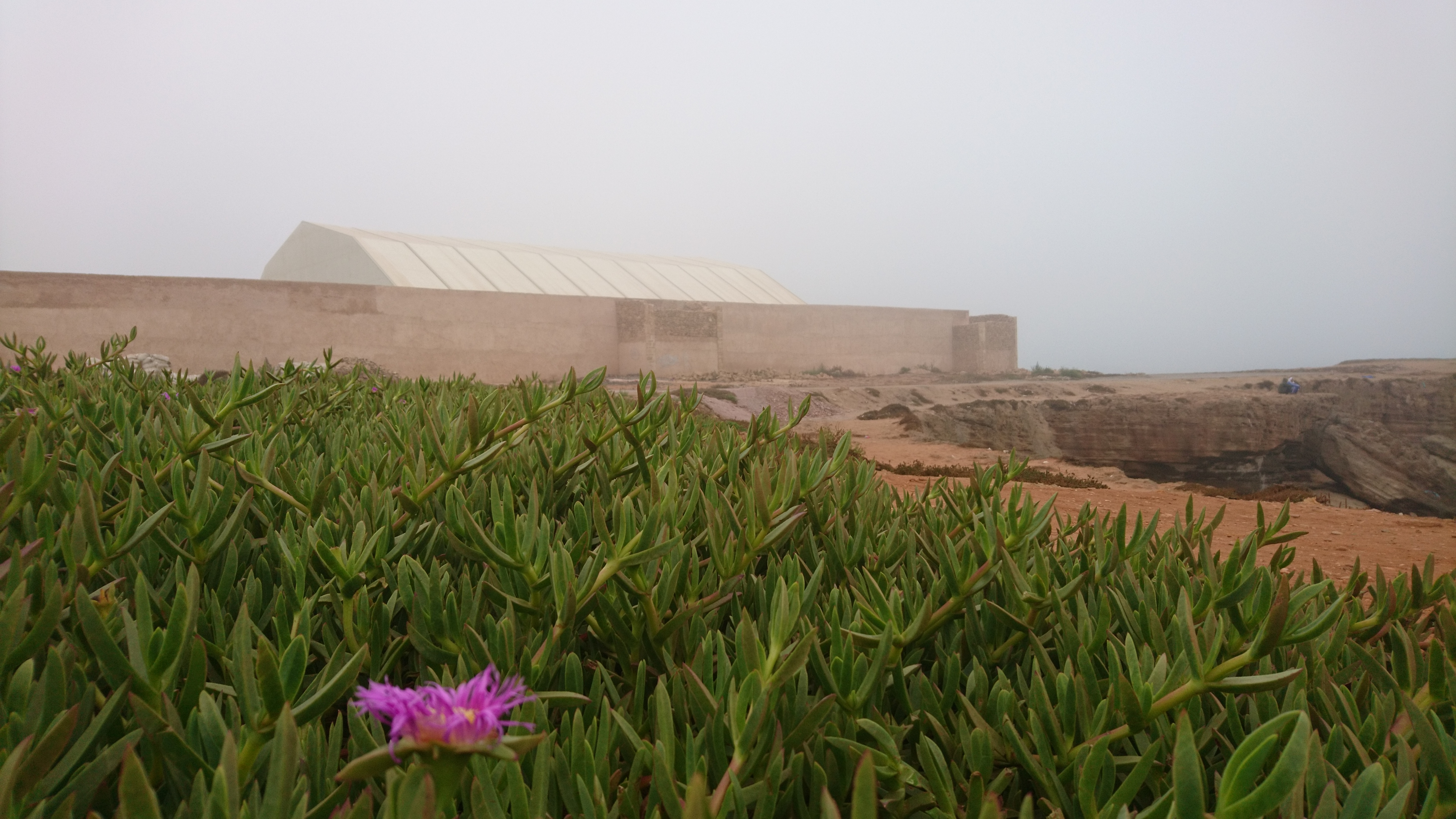
- Kasbah Gnawa from outside
- Interactive map of Kasbah Gnawa
- 34°03′44″N 6°48′48″W
- Type: Fortification, Military base
- Location: Salé, Morocco

History
- Founded: 1708
- Founder: Sultan Moulay Isma'il ibn Sharif
- Built: 1708

Site notes
- Area: 7000 sqm
- Architectural style: Moroccan

Kasbah Gnawa (Arabic: قصبة ڭناوة), also referred to as: Kasbah of Gnaouas or Ismailian Kasbah is a kasbah located in the city of Salé in Morocco, and is the only one on the right bank of the Bou Regreg river.

Nowadays, the kasbah is hosting a circus school called "Shemsy's", which is the national Moroccan circus school, and the only circus school in Morocco and the whole of Africa.

== History ==
The Kasbah Gnawa was originally one of the largest fortresses erected during the reign of Sultan Moulay Ismail in 1708 where the Jich Abid al-Bukhari (black slave guards from Western Sudan) were placed to protect the coasts of Salé and Rabat against attempts of penetration and foreign occupation. The guards were later accused of disrespecting the honor and virtue of local women, which provoked a violent reaction from the inhabitants, who formed a group led by the governor Abdelhaq Fennich, and attacked the kasbah in 1758.

After the death of Moulay Ismail, The monument was devastated due to riots and internal wars. The Kasbah was thus forgotten until the arrival of Hubert Lyautey in 1912, as the first general resident of France in Morocco. During the First World War, it served as a gathering point for the Moroccan infantry battalions who successively stayed there while awaiting their departure for the various fronts in France and the East.

In 1948, the kabsah was promoted to a national heritage site, by a royal dahir.

== Pictures ==
Contemporary pictures from the Kasbah Gnawa

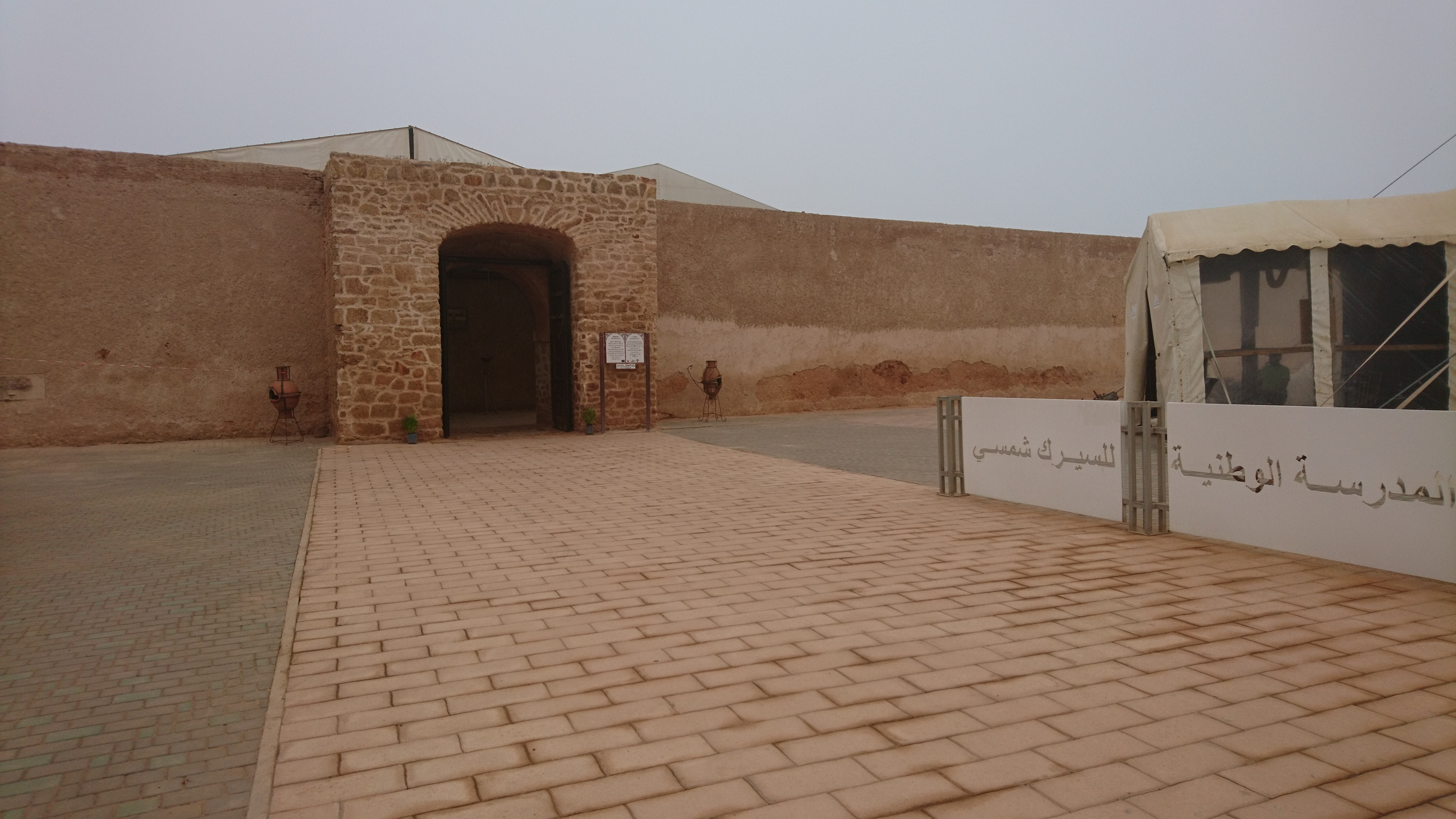
Actual entrance of Kasbah Gnawa

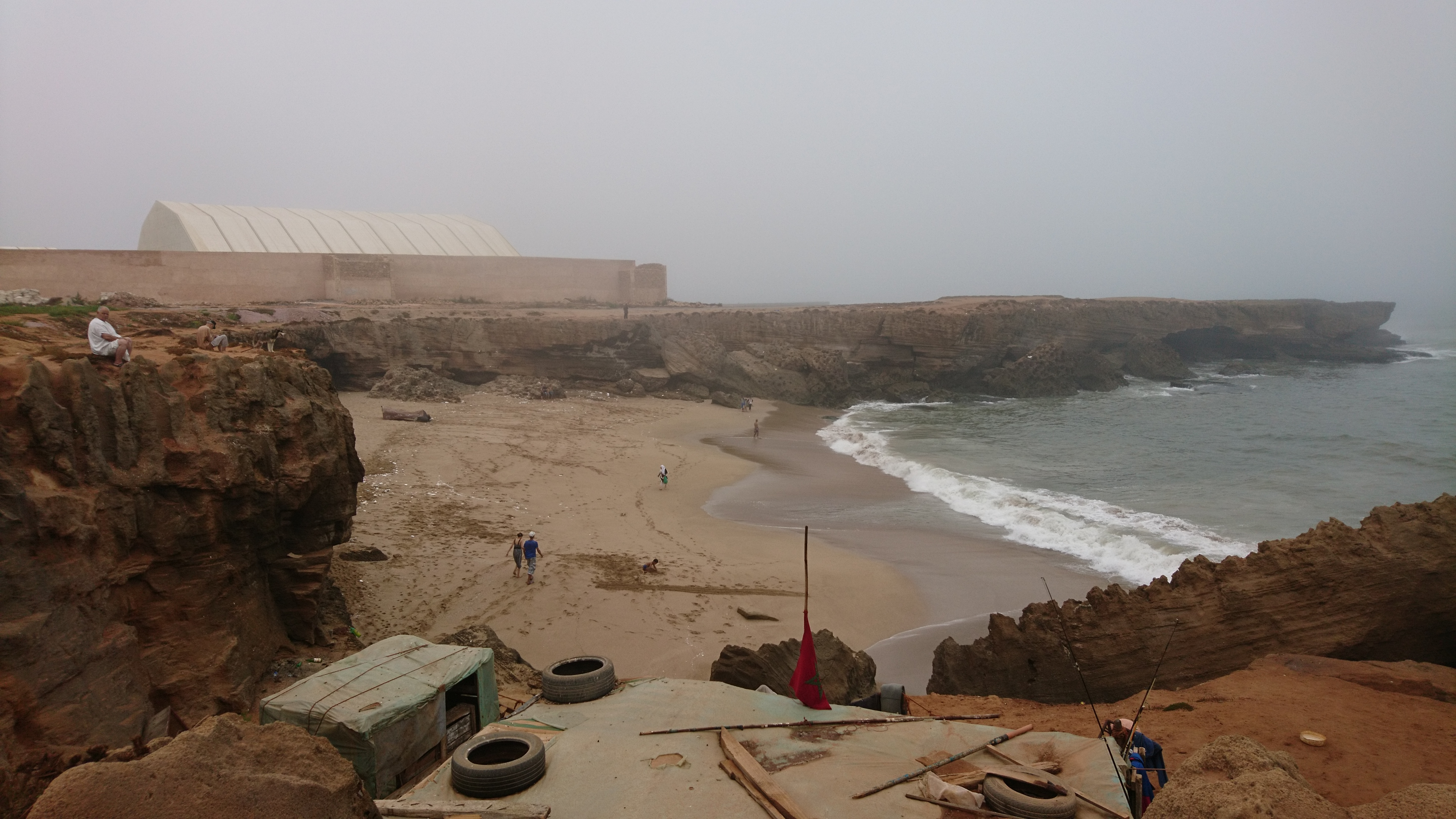
Kasbah Gnawa and the Atlantic Ocean

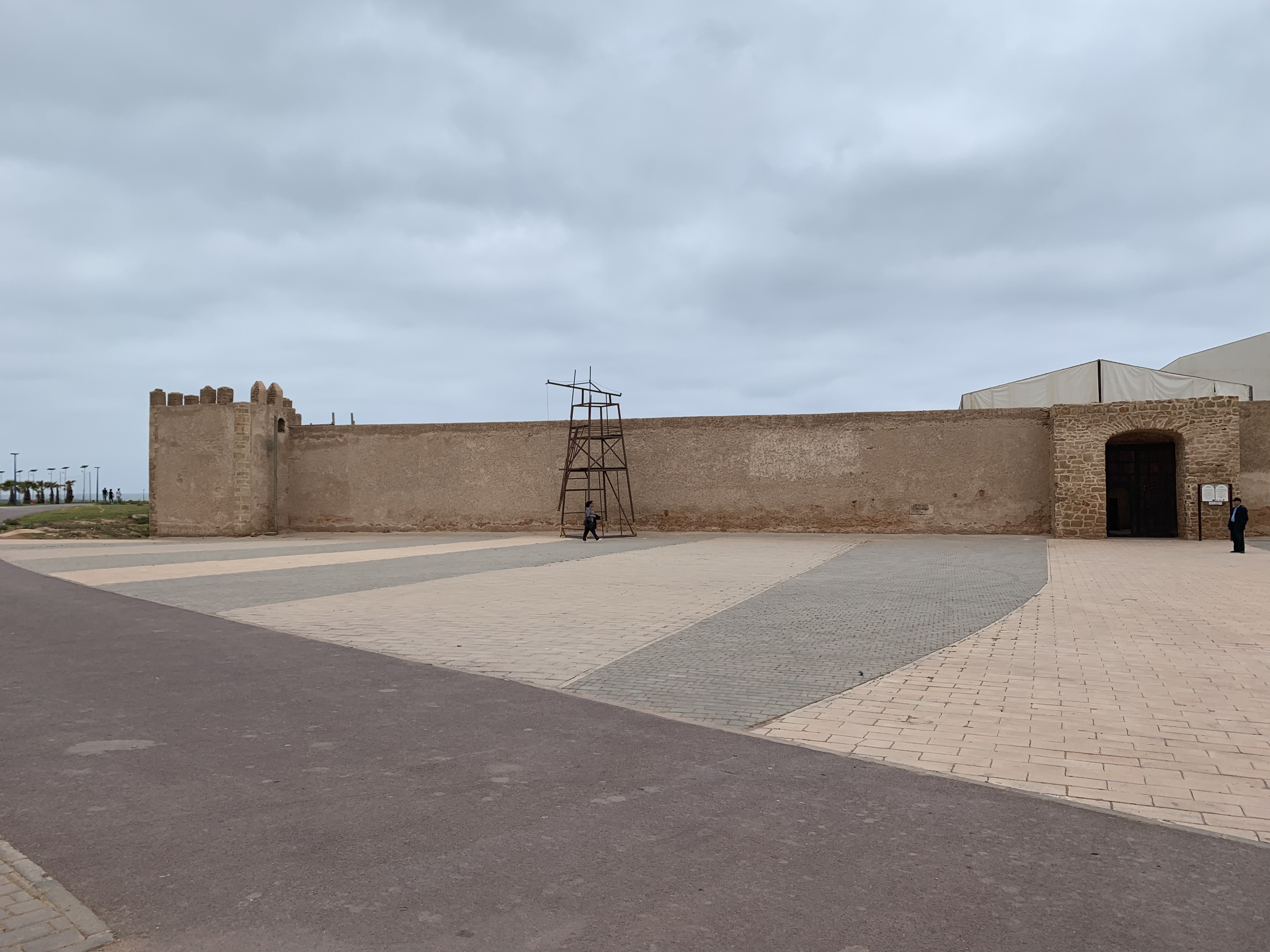
Wall surrounding Kasbah Gnawa
