= List of monuments in Guelmim =

This is a list of monuments that are classified by the Moroccan ministry of culture around Guelmim.

== Monuments and sites in Guelmim ==
Image		Name	Location	Coordinates	Identifier
	Upload Photo	Nebka Lebaïda	Guelmim		pc_archeologie/bdiba:ST_C24
	Upload Photo	Tighermt	Guelmim		pc_architecture/sanae:150215
	Upload Photo	Agadir n'Timoulay Oumaloukt	Guelmim		pc_architecture/sanae:010201
	Upload Photo	Guoulmine	Guelmim		pc_architecture/sanae:200333
