= List of monuments in Safi, Morocco =

This is a list of monuments that are classified by the Moroccan ministry of culture around Safi, Morocco.

== Monuments and sites in Safi ==
Image		Name	Location	Coordinates	Identifier
	Upload Photo	Sea Castle	Safi	32°17'50.766"N, 9°14'39.196"W	pc_architecture/sanae:070001
	Upload Photo	Sidi Mohammed Salih	Safi	32°15'37.451"N, 9°14'58.279"W	pc_architecture/sanae:490017
	Upload Photo	Borj Ed-dar (Safi)	Safi	32°17'51.288"N, 9°13'37.452"W	pc_architecture/sanae:070002
	Upload Photo	Portuguese church, Safi	Safi		pc_architecture/sanae:100018
	Upload Photo	Safi Madrasa	Safi		pc_architecture/sanae:270027
	Upload Photo	Souira Qedima Kasbah	Safi	32°2'3.098"N, 9°20'39.743"W	pc_architecture/sanae:190022
	Upload Photo	Safi Medina	Safi	32°17'57.052"N, 9°14'30.876"W	pc_architecture/sanae:280017
	Upload Photo	Potters' Quarter	Safi	32°18'3.136"N, 9°14'22.207"W	pc_architecture/sanae:280002
	Upload Photo	Ben Hamidouch Kasba	Safi	32°17'50.618"N, 9°13'51.503"W	pc_architecture/sanae:190011
	Upload Photo	Kasbah of Ayyir	Safi	32°40'35.825"N, 9°5'5.842"W	pc_architecture/sanae:190084
	Upload Photo	El Ablat Borj	Safi	32°19'15.143"N, 9°15'34.740"W	pc_architecture/sanae:050033
	Upload Photo	Borj Souira El Kadima	Safi	32°2'3.098"N, 9°20'39.743"W	pc_architecture/sanae:050034
