= List of monuments in Ouarzazate =

This is a list of monuments that are classified by the Moroccan ministry of culture around Ouarzazate.

== Monuments and sites in Ouarzazate ==
Image		Name	Location	Coordinates	Identifier
	Upload Photo	Ksar of Taourirt	Ouarzazate	30°55'12.40"N, 6°53'57.95"W	pc_architecture/sanae:200033
	Upload Photo	Ksar Imassine	Ouarzazate	31°7'26.299"N, 6°20'57.030"W	pc_architecture/sanae:220157
	Upload Photo	Ksar Timadriouine	Ouarzazate	31°24'38.531"N, 5°42'33.764"W	pc_architecture/sanae:220050
	Upload Photo	Ksar El-Qasba Oulad Aameur	Ouarzazate	30°56'8.534"N, 6°56'18.920"W	pc_architecture/sanae:220058
	Upload Photo	Agadir Elkhezine	Ouarzazate	31°16'22.433"N, 6°35'17.646"W	pc_architecture/sanae:010034
	Upload Photo	Lahsoune Kasbah of Glaoui	Ouarzazate		pc_architecture/sanae:200020
	Upload Photo	Amallal Igherm	Ouarzazate		pc_architecture/sanae:200055
	Upload Photo	Kasbah Amajgag	Ouarzazate		pc_architecture/sanae:200182
	Upload Photo	Galmous - Bin Chab	Ouarzazate		pc_architecture/sanae:200267
	Upload Photo	Diab Palace	Ouarzazate		pc_architecture/sanae:200216
