= List of monuments and sites in Figuig, Morocco =

Moroccan monuments list

This is a list of monuments and sites that are classified or inventoried by the Moroccan ministry of culture around Figuig.

== Monuments and sites in Figuig ==
| Image | | Name | Location | Coordinates | Identifier |
|---|---|---|---|---|---|
| | Upload Photo | Ksar of Hammam Fougani | Figuig | 32°7'5"N, 1°13'5"W | pc_architecture/sanae:220009 |
| | Upload Photo | Ksar of Lamaïz | Figuig | 32°6'57"N, 1°13'46"W | pc_architecture/sanae:220012 |
| | Upload Photo | Ksar of Ouled Slimane | Figuig | 32°6'50"N, 1°13'49"W | pc_architecture/sanae:220011 |
| | Upload Photo | Ksar of Zenaga | Figuig | 32°5'57.322"N, 1°14'9.593"W | pc_architecture/sanae:220014 |
