= List of monuments in Oujda =

This is a list of monuments that are classified by the Moroccan ministry of culture around Oujda.

== Monuments and sites in Oujda ==
Image		Name	Location	Coordinates	Identifier
	Upload Photo	Lalla Meriem Park	Oujda	34°40'37.546"N, 1°54'48.226"W	pc_architecture/sanae:180106
	Upload Photo	Remparts of old town of Oujda	Oujda	34°40'49.811"N, 1°54'49.734"W	pc_architecture/sanae:410007
	Upload Photo	Oujda Cathedral	Oujda	34°40'46.506"N, 1°55'2.348"W	pc_architecture/sanae:100027
	Upload Photo	Bab Sidi Abd El Wahab	Oujda	34°40'47.654"N, 1°54'36.598"W	pc_architecture/sanae:390080
	Upload Photo	Bab Sidi Aissa	Oujda	34°40'38.431"N, 1°54'57.431"W	pc_architecture/sanae:390081
	Upload Photo	Kasba Saïdia	Saïdia	35°5'2.332"N, 2°14'13.603"W	pc_architecture/sanae:190016
	Upload Photo	Debdou Kasbah	Debdou	33°59'6.396"N, 3°2'23.982"W	pc_architecture/sanae:190021
	Upload Photo	Kasba El Ayoun	Taourirt		pc_architecture/sanae:190033
	Upload Photo	Borj Rouis	Taourirt	34°23'54.892"N, 2°53'35.095"W	pc_architecture/sanae:050051
