= List of monuments in Taroudant =

This is a list of monuments that are classified by the Moroccan ministry of culture around Taroudant.

== Monuments and sites in Taroudant ==
Image		Name	Location	Coordinates	Identifier
	Upload Photo	Arazan synagogue	Taroudant		pc_architecture/sanae:560021
	Upload Photo	Rempart around Taroudant	Taroudant	30°28'16.680"N, 8°52'16.993"W	pc_architecture/sanae:410014
	Upload Photo	Agadir Oussaïs	Taroudant		pc_architecture/sanae:010117
	Upload Photo	Medina of Taroudant	Taroudant	30°28'29.129"N, 8°52'52.381"W	pc_architecture/sanae:280019
