= List of monuments in Tetouan =

This is a list of monuments that are classified by the Moroccan ministry of culture around Tetouan.

== Monuments and sites in Tetouan ==
Image		Name	Location	Coordinates	Identifier
	Upload Photo	Medina of Tétouan	Tétouan	35°34'14.9"N, 5°22'0.1"W	pc_architecture/sanae:280009
	Upload Photo	Borj Souk El-Hout	Tétouan		pc_architecture/sanae:050041
	Upload Photo	Bab Sebta, Tetouan	Tétouan		pc_architecture/sanae:390060
	Upload Photo	Bab Jiaf	Tétouan	35°34'25.676"N, 5°21'54.839"W	pc_architecture/idpcm:13E093
	Upload Photo	Bab Mkaber	Tétouan	35°34'23.984"N, 5°22'5.117"W	pc_architecture/idpcm:128E98
	Upload Photo	Bab Remouz	Tétouan	35°34'3.349"N, 5°22'1.279"W	pc_architecture/sanae:390067
	Upload Photo	Bab El Okla	Tétouan	35°34'14.081"N, 5°21'48.661"W	pc_architecture/sanae:390066
