= Oum Er-Rbia River =

Coordinates: 33.320°N 8.338°W

Oum Er-Rbia
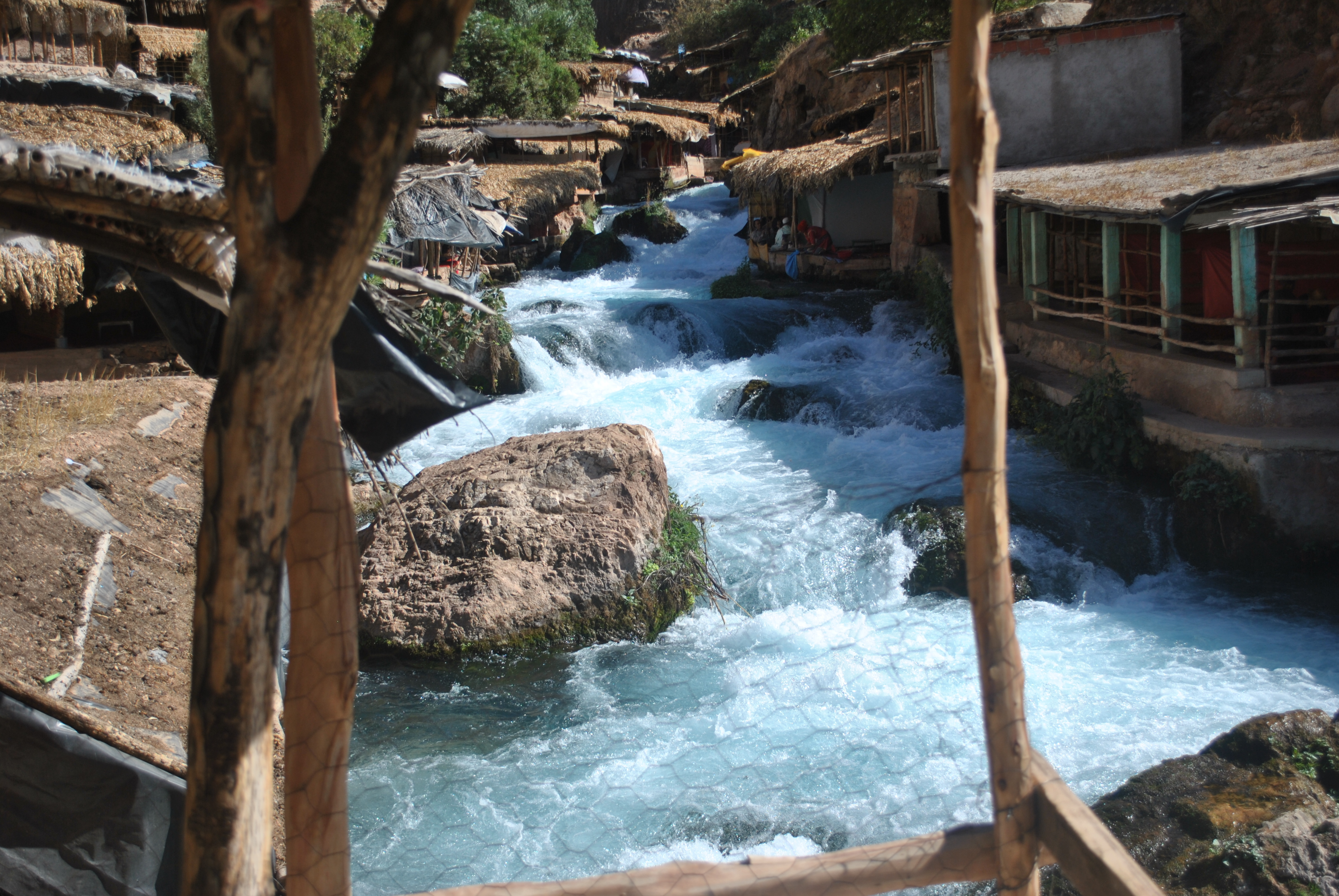

Location
- Country: Morocco

Physical characteristics
- Source
  - location: Middle Atlas
- Mouth
  - location: Atlantic Ocean
- Length: 555 km (345 mi)
- Discharge
  - average: 105 m^{3}/s (3,700 cu ft/s)

Oum Er-Rbia (Arabic: أم الربيع, romanized: the mother of spring, Tamazight: ⵡⴰⵏⵙⵉⴼⵏ) is a large, long and high-throughput river in central Morocco.

The river is 555 kilometres (345 mi) long. With an average water throughput of 105 m^{3}/s, Oum Er-Rbia is the second-largest river in Morocco after the Sebou River. It originates in the Middle Atlas and passes through the city of Khénifra, arriving at its mouth at the Atlantic Ocean at the port of Azemmour, located on its left bank.

Oum Er-Rbia has six dams, the most important of which is Al Massira Dam. Its most important tributaries are the El-Abid River, the Tessaoute River, and the Lakhdar River.

Hanno the Navigator is believed by some scholars to have navigated the Oum Er-Rbia in the 6th century BC. According to scholars, the original Berber common name of the river is Wansifen and was only changed recently, circa 16th or 17th century, and a nearby village called Oum Rabia might have influenced this change.

Oum Er-Rbia is fed by a large number of groundwater springs. The area near its headwaters is called "The Forty Springs" as a result, although that is a poetic term rather than an exact count.

== Gallery ==
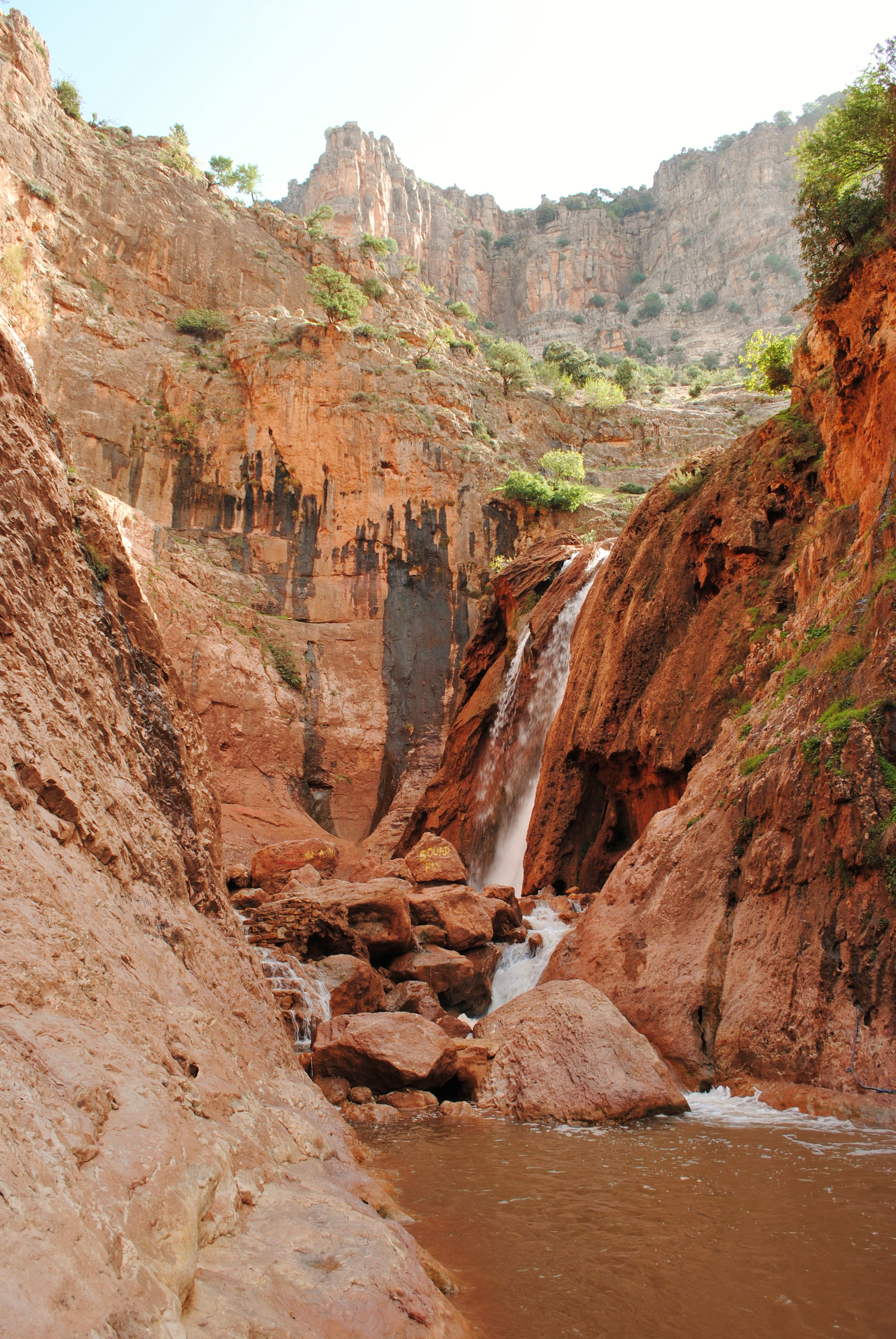
This cascade forms one of the sources of the Oum Er-Rbia, near Khénifra

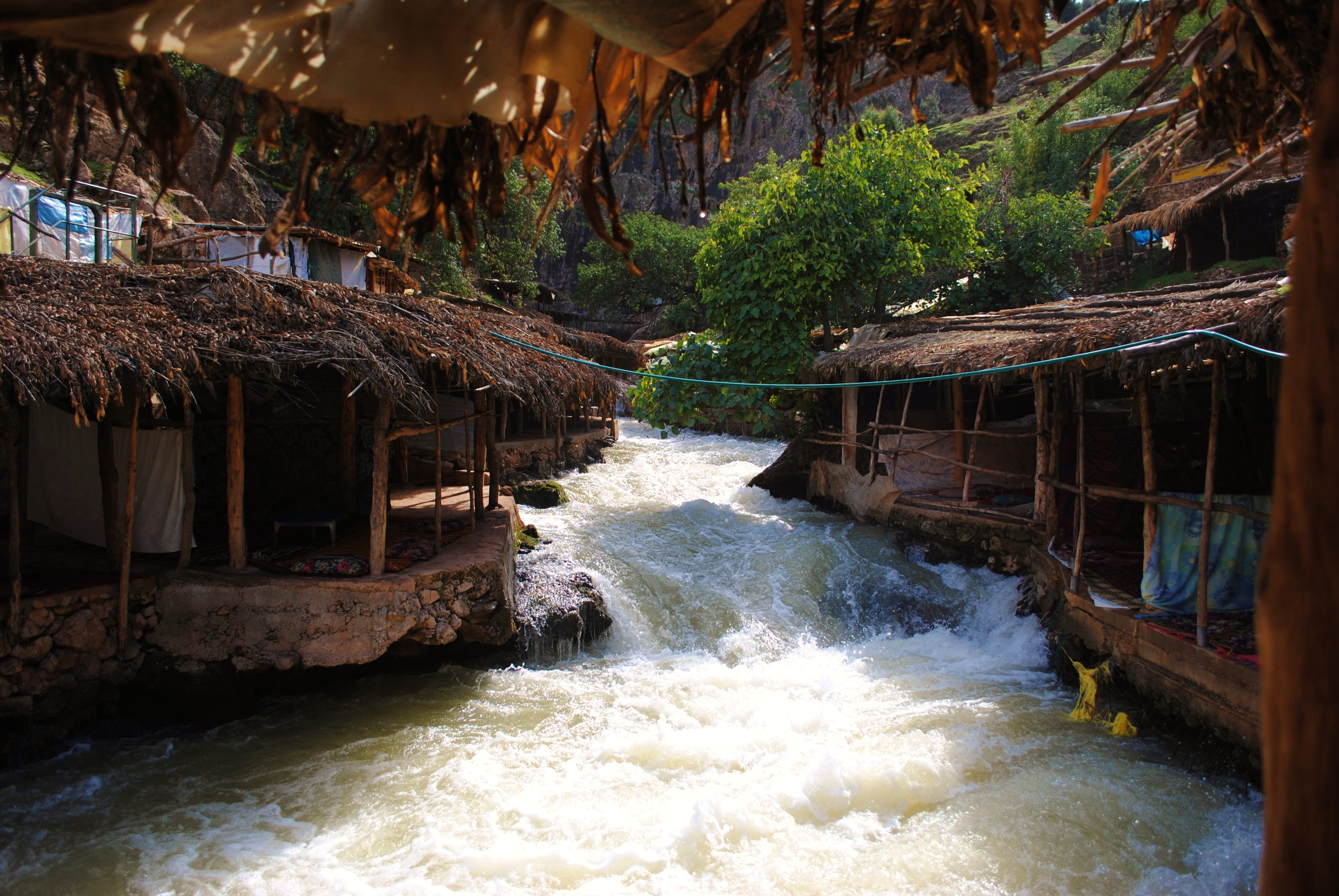
Structures along the Oum Er-Rbia

Azemmour from the Oum Er-Rbia

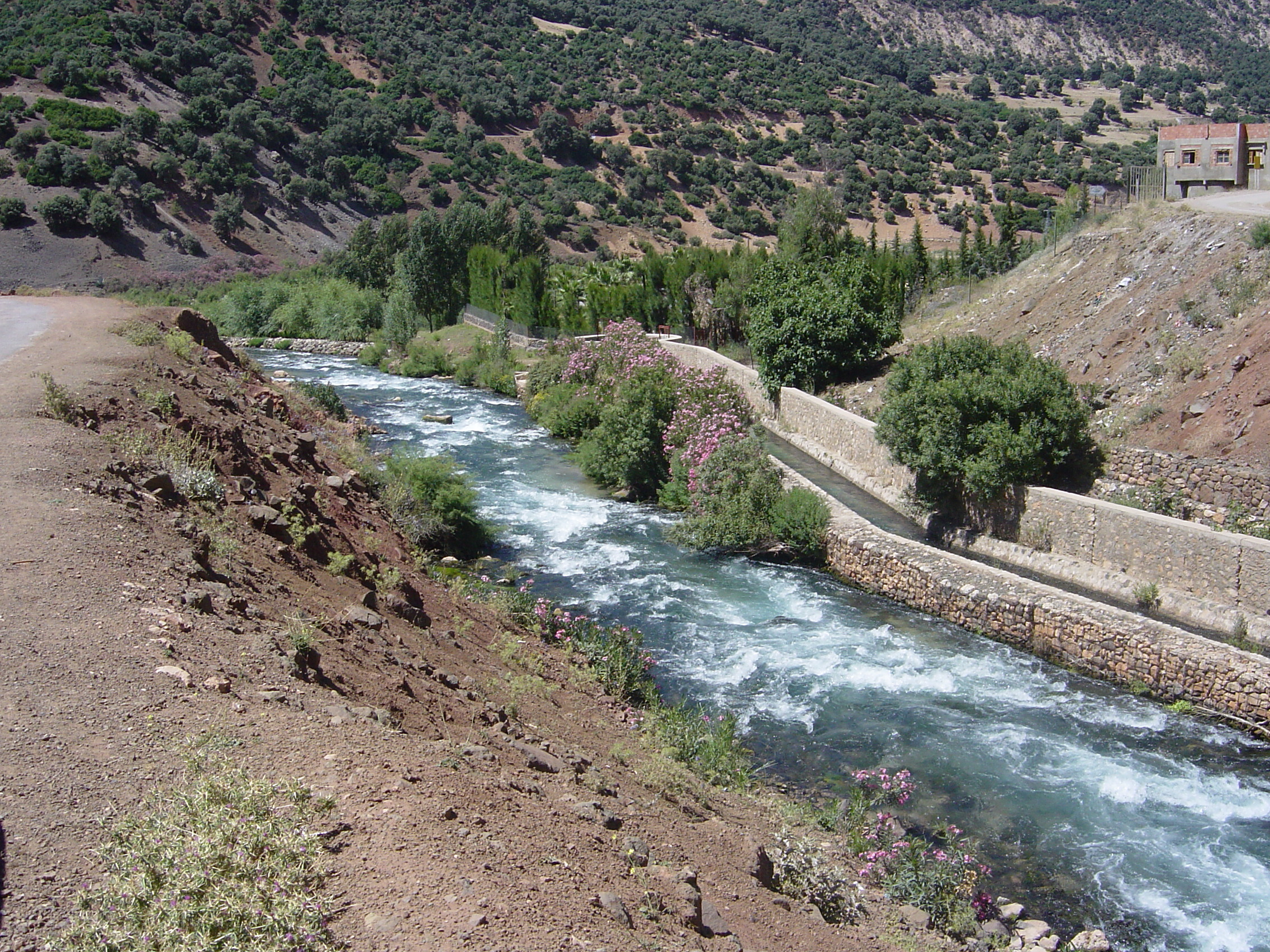
The Oum Er-Rbia river

The meanders of the Oum Er-Rbia River from the Kasbah Boulaouane

Upstream view of the river at the Daourat Dam
