= List of monuments in Chefchaouen =

This is a list of monuments that are classified by the Moroccan ministry of culture around Chefchaouen.

== Monuments and sites in Chefchaouen ==
Image		Name	Location	Coordinates	Identifier
	Upload Photo	El-Makhzen Square	Chefchaouen	35°10'8.432"N, 5°15'38.758"W	pc_architecture/sanae:360010
	Upload Photo	Kaf Moulay Abdelkader	Chefchaouen		pc_architecture/sanae:160116
	Upload Photo	Cimetery Sidi Abdelhamid	Chefchaouen	35°10'27.872"N, 5°15'53.528"W	pc_architecture/sanae:260614
	Upload Photo	Chefchaouen Church	Chefchaouen	35°10'9.696"N, 5°16'6.625"W	pc_architecture/sanae:100025
	Upload Photo	Kasbah of Chefchaouen	Chefchaouen	35°10'7.219"N, 5°15'41.425"W	pc_architecture/sanae:190029
