= Sidi Ifni Military Treasury =

Coordinates: 29°22′53″N 10°10′33″W

- Pagaduría Militar de Sidi Ifni
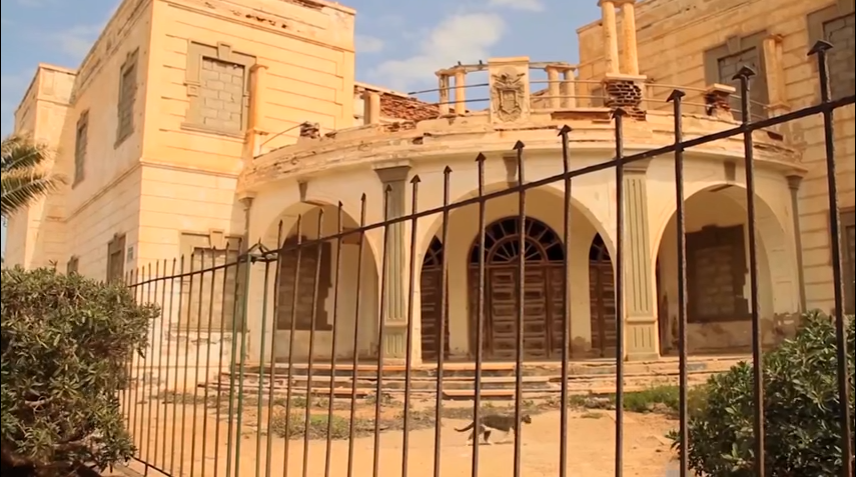
- Interactive map of the Sidi Ifni Military Treasury area
- Alternative names: Spanish Consulate of Sidi Ifni

General information
- Architectural style: Art Deco
- Location: Sidi Ifni, Guelmim-Oued Noun, Morocco
- Completed: 1938

The Sidi Ifni Military Treasury or Spanish Consulate of Sidi Ifni is a historic building located in Sidi Ifni, in the Sidi Ifni Province, within the Guelmim-Oued Noun region of Morocco.

This building is classified as a monument by the Moroccan Ministry of Culture.

== History ==
The building was constructed to serve as the military treasury for Sidi Ifni during the Spanish colonial period of Ifni. After the Spanish province of Ifni was ceded to Morocco in 1969, the Spanish state retained this property in Sidi Ifni, along with 21 houses, and it functioned as the Spanish consulate. In 1975, it ceased operations in favor of the Consulate General of Spain in Agadir.

In 2012, a project was initiated to rehabilitate the building and use it as a Spanish-Moroccan cultural center.

== Description ==
Inaugurated in 1938, the building features an Art Deco architectural style. It is considered the most outstanding example of colonial and Art Deco architecture in Sidi Ifni. The facade is notable for its three arches and three doors forming a porch, above which there is a terrace.

== See also ==
- Art Deco architecture in Melilla
