= Azemmour =

Town in Casablanca-Settat, Morocco

Azemmour: أزمور (Arabic); ⴰⵣⵎⵎⵓⵔ (Standard Moroccan Tamazight)
- City
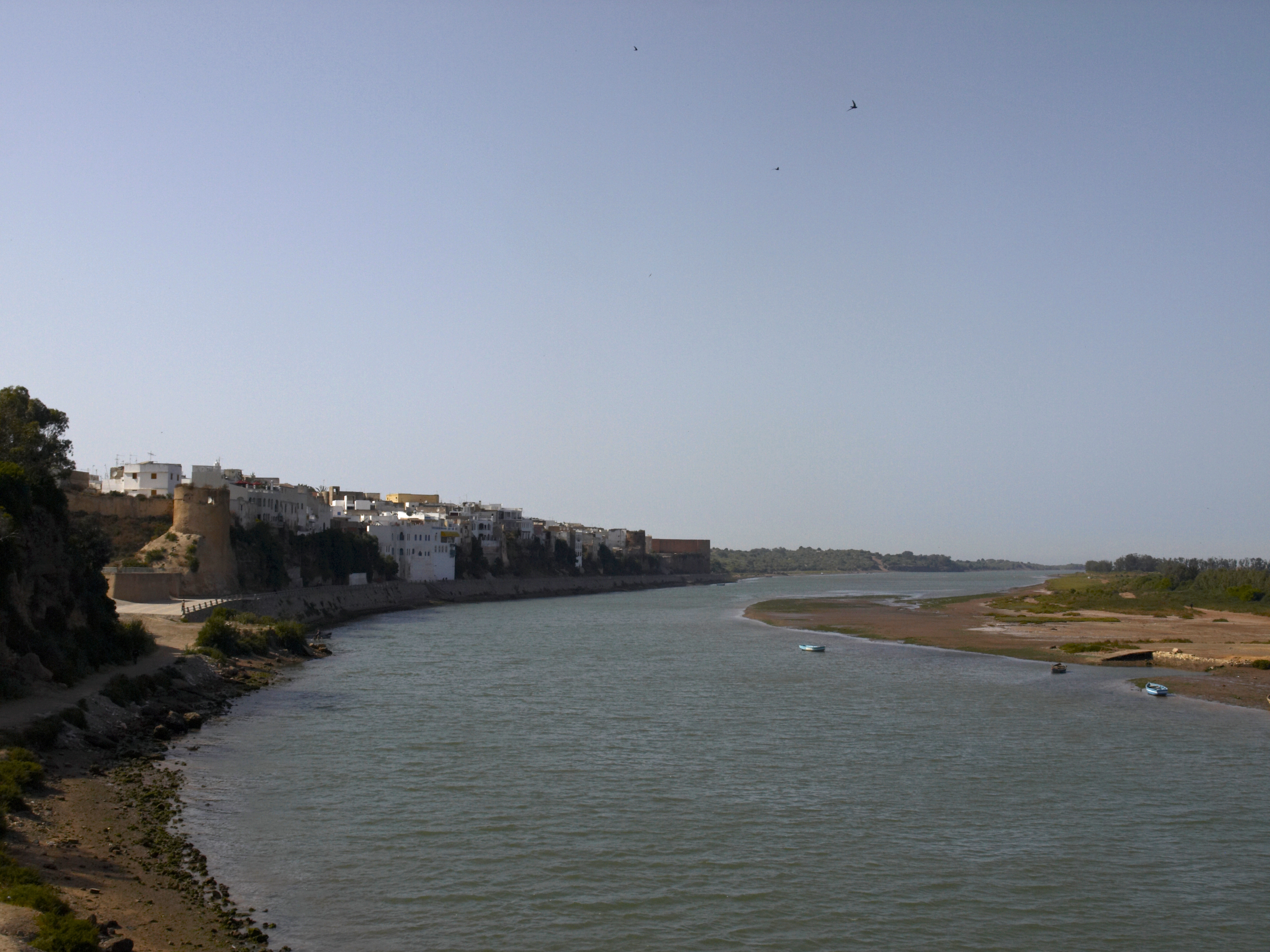
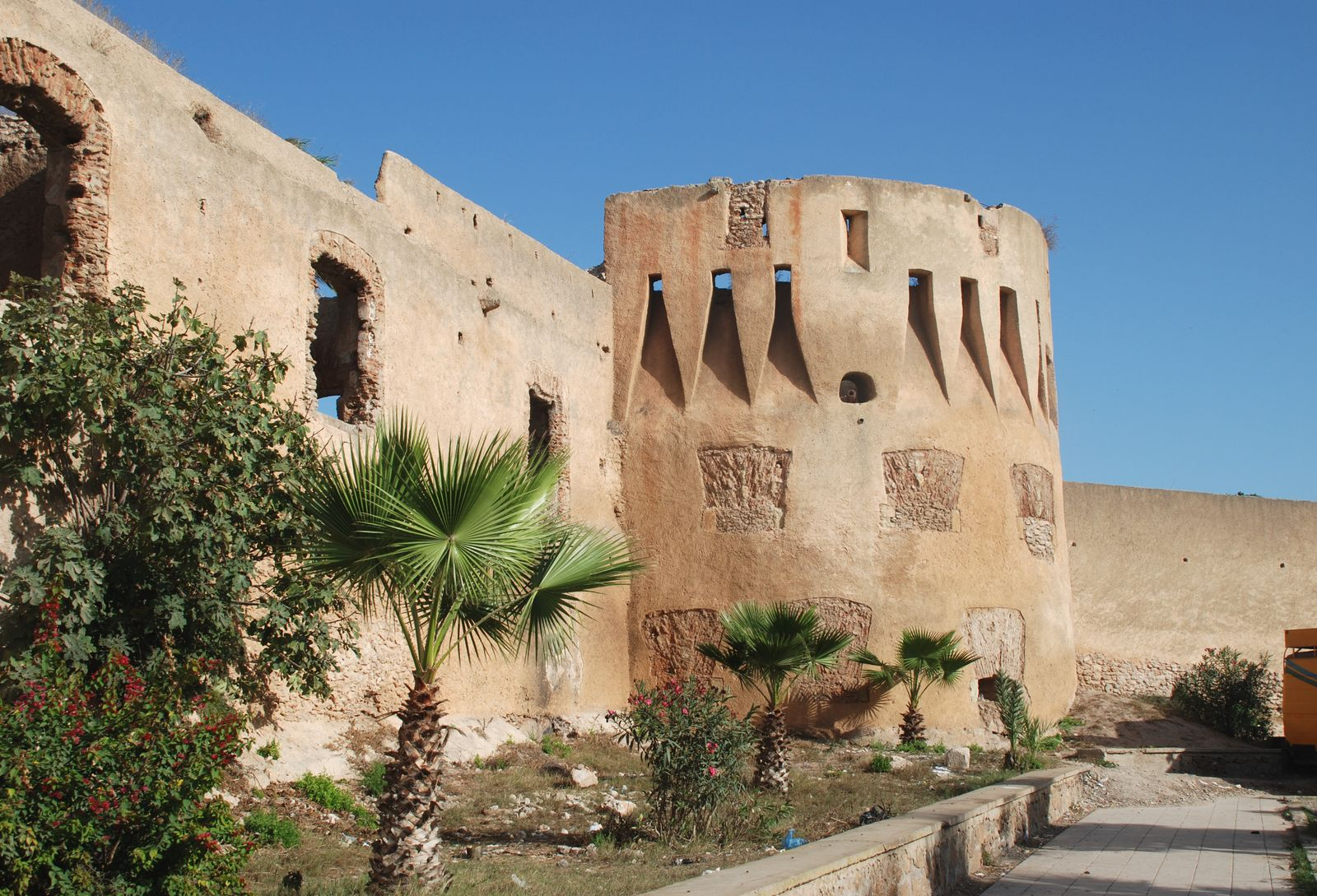
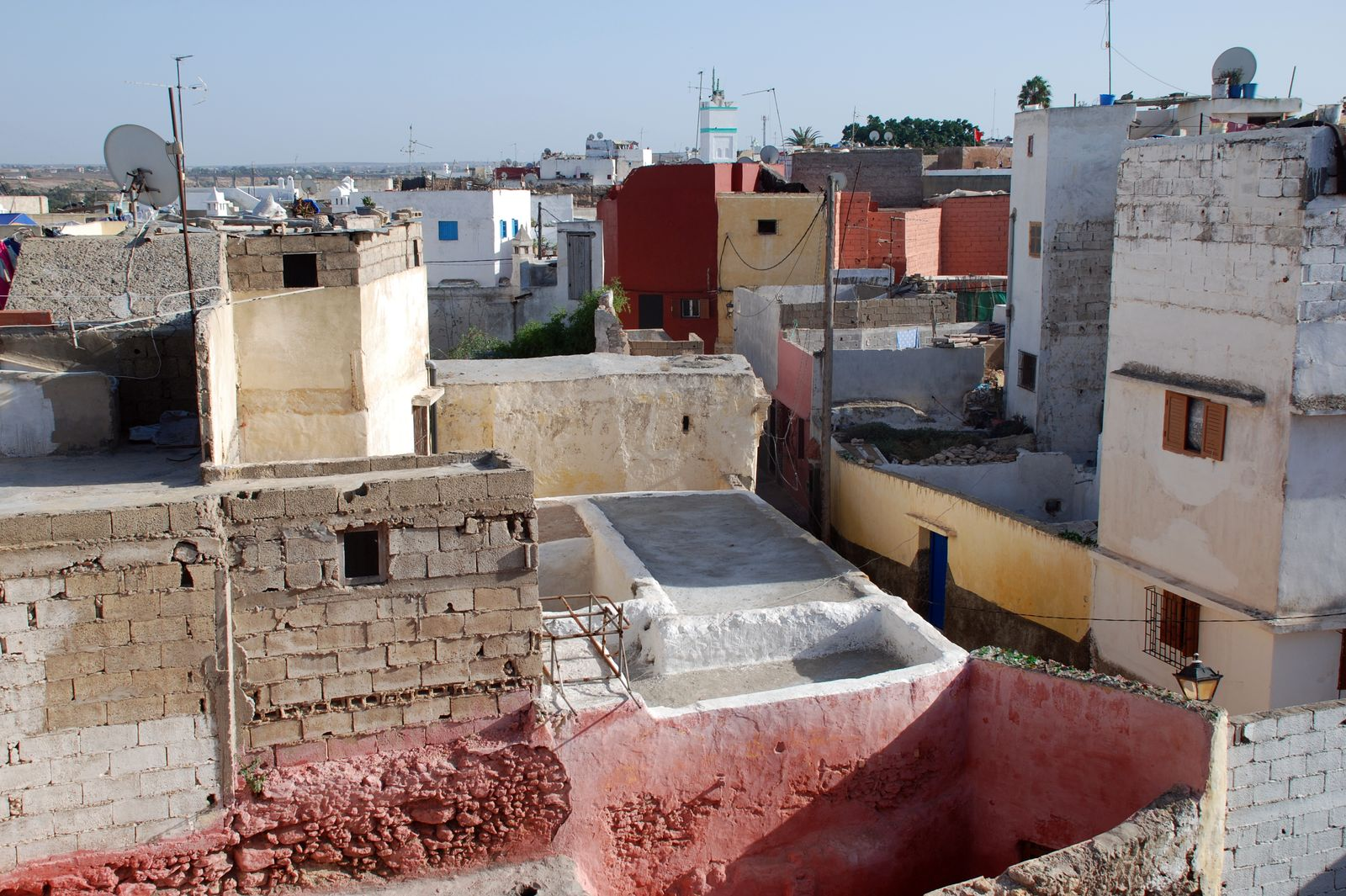
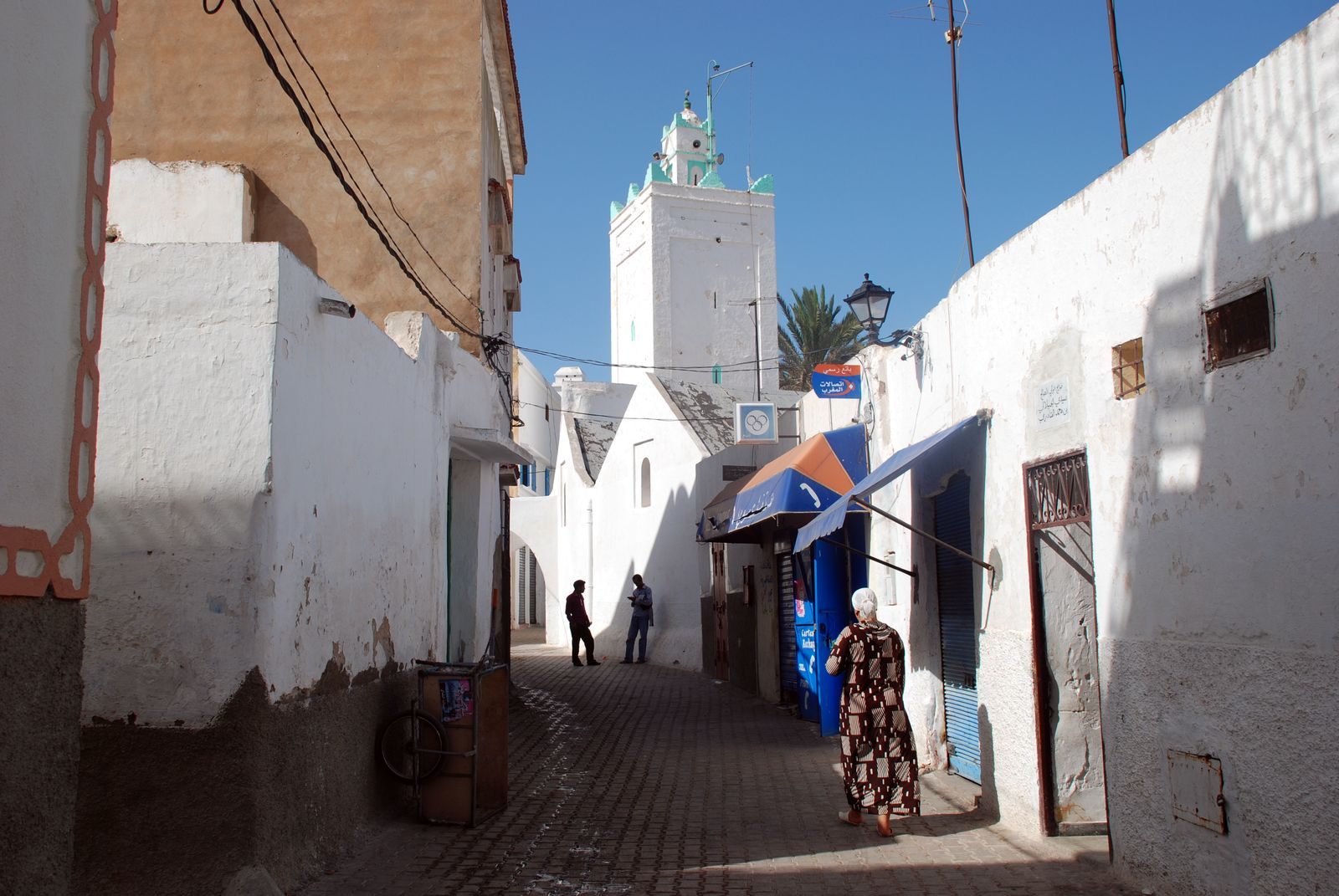
- Azemmour old city
- Interactive map of Azemmour
- Coordinates: 33°17′16″N 8°20′32″W
- Country: Morocco
- Region: Casablanca-Settat
- Province: El Jadida

Population (2024)
  - Total: 42,098
- Time zone: UTC+0 (GMT)

Azemmour or Azammur (Arabic: أزمور, romanized: azammūr; Standard Moroccan Tamazight: ⴰⵣⵎⵎⵓⵔ, romanized: azemmur) is a town on the Atlantic coast of Morocco. It is located in El Jadida Province, on the left bank of the Oum Er-Rbia River, 75 kms southwest of Casablanca.

== Etymology ==
The word Azemmour comes from the Berber word Azemmur (ⴰⵣⵎⵎⵓⵔ) which means "wild olive tree".

== History ==
Azemmour is generally identified as the Punic Azama, latinized as Asama.

Before 1486, it was a dependency of the King of Fez. In 1486 its inhabitants became vassals and tributaries of João II of Portugal.

In 1513 Azemmour's governor Moulay Zayam refused to pay the tribute and mustered a powerful, well-equipped army. The Portuguese king Manuel responded to this challenge by sending a massive fleet of 500 ships and 15 thousand soldiers (Bergreen, 19). Dom James, Duke of Braganza led this army and on September 1 he conquered the city with no resistance from its inhabitants. Ferdinand Magellan, the navigator famed for leading the first-ever circumnavigation of the earth, was among the Portuguese soldiers; he lost his horse in skirmishes outside the city. Portuguese control of the city lasted only for a short period; it was abandoned by João III of Portugal in 1541 due to his court's economic difficulties.

Historically, Azemmour functioned as the capital of the Bedouin tribe of the Doukkala.

== Geography ==
Azemmour is located on the Oum Er-Rbia River 75 kilometres (47 mi) west of Casablanca.

Azemmour's beach is a place for surfing and kitesurfing. Also called Haouzia, the area's flora includes eucalyptus and pine.

== Culture ==
A spring festival used to be held annually in Azemmour in March. It was first held in 2007. The patron saint of Azemmour is Abu Shuayb. His mausoleum was built on the order of Mohammed ben Abdallah. Each year, a moussem is celebrated to honour him. The Old City's walls are decorated by several local artists. The city features a medina, which has three parts, a Jewish mellah, a kasbah, and the old medina. A historic lighthouse called Sidi Boubeker is located 8 kilometres (5.0 mi) north of Azemmour.

== Notable natives or residents ==
- Jaafar Aksikas, Moroccan American author and intellectual
- Estevanico, also known as Esteban the Moor, was enslaved and traveled with a Spanish expedition to North America in 1527. He is the first African to travel with explorers in North America and was one of four men out of several hundred to survive shipwrecks on the Florida and Texas coasts, Native American slavery and attacks, and other setbacks over a six-year period before he and his party reached safety in a Spanish colonial town.
- Abdallah Laroui, Moroccan historian, novelist and philosopher

== Images ==
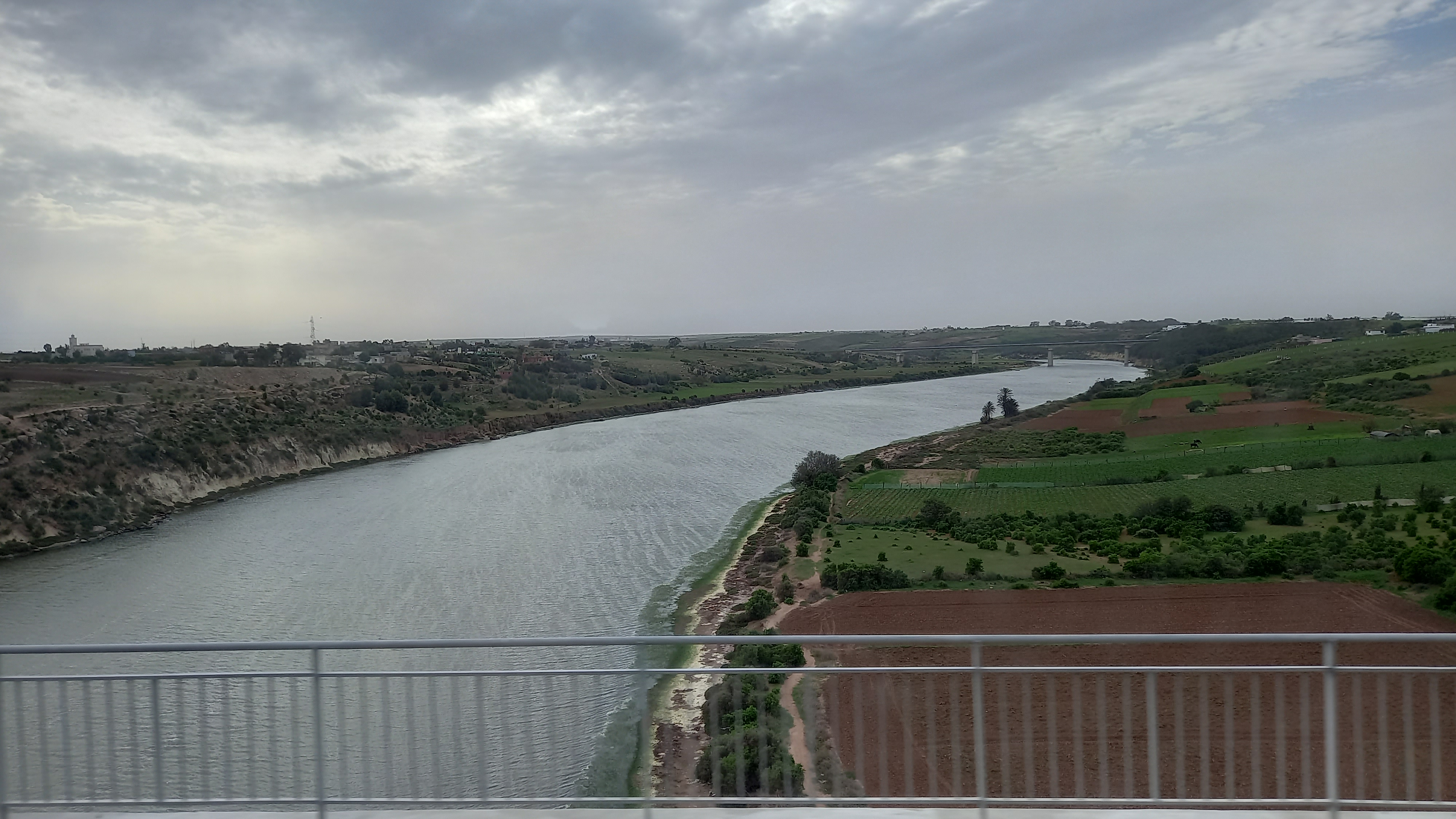
Bridges over the Oum Rabia

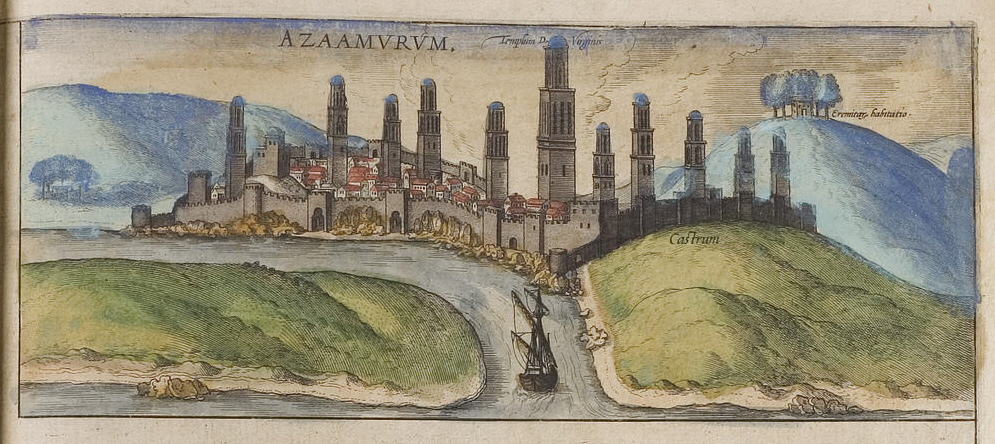
Azemmour 16th century.

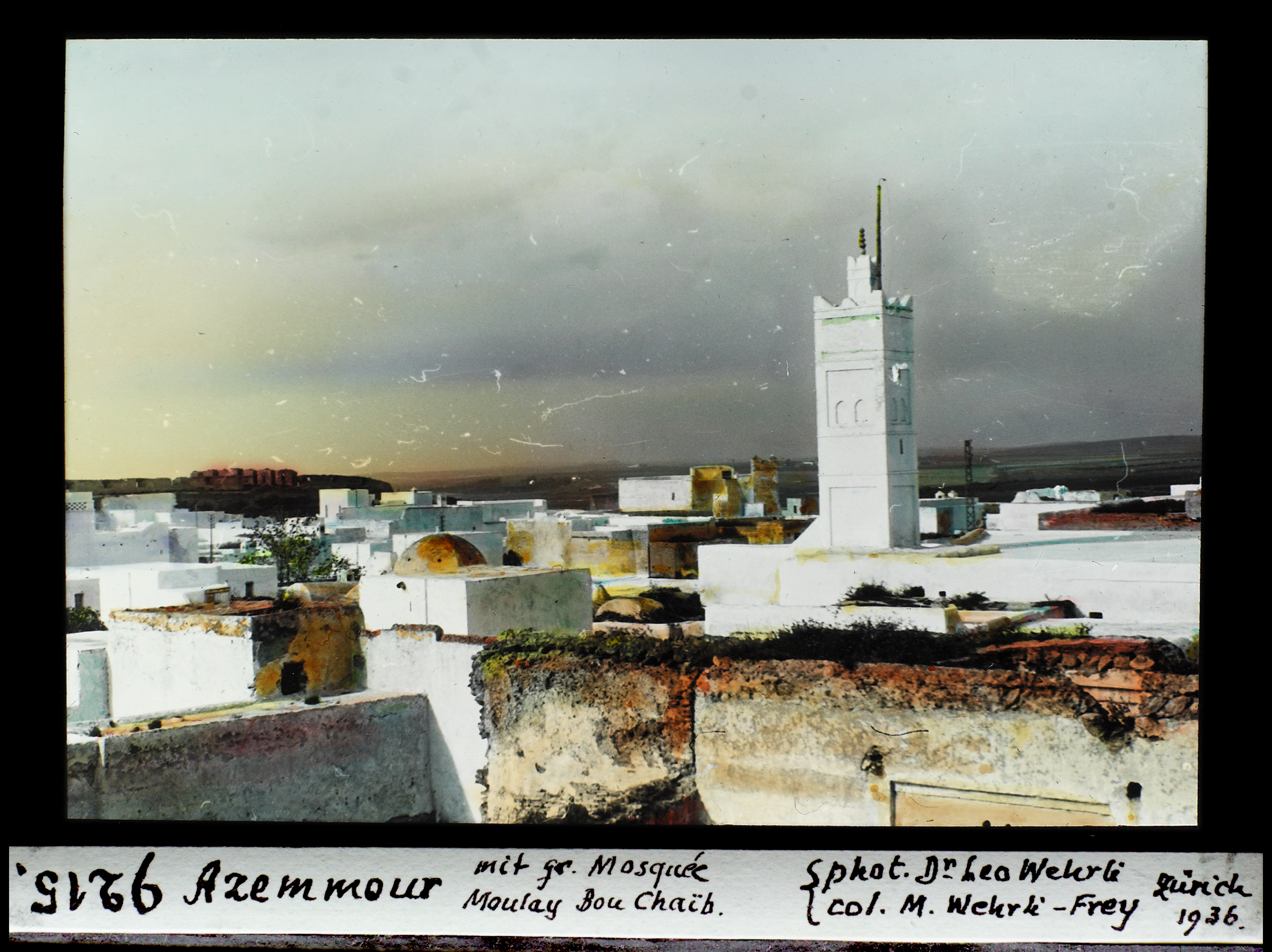
Azemmour in 1936

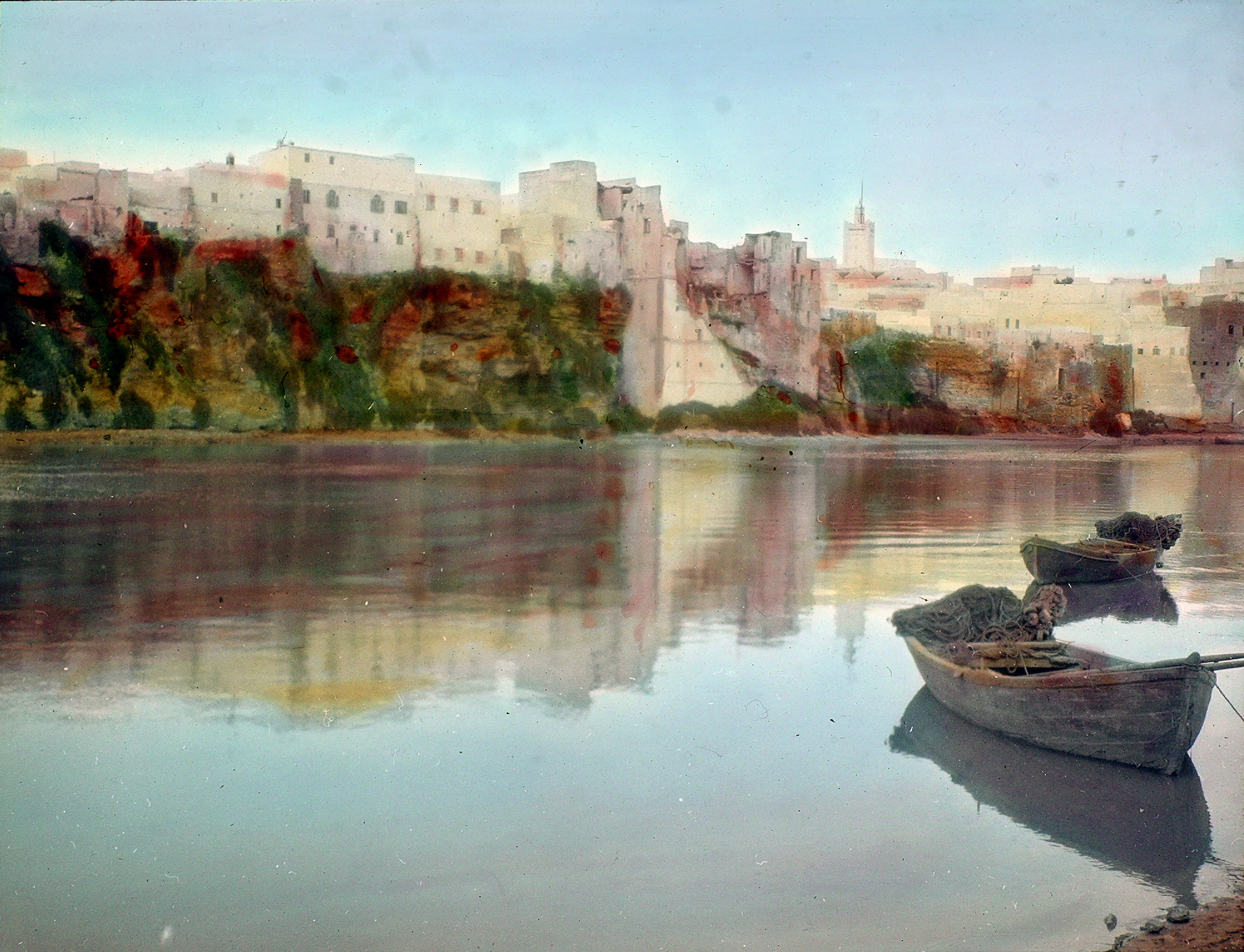
Azemmour from the Oum Rabia in 1936

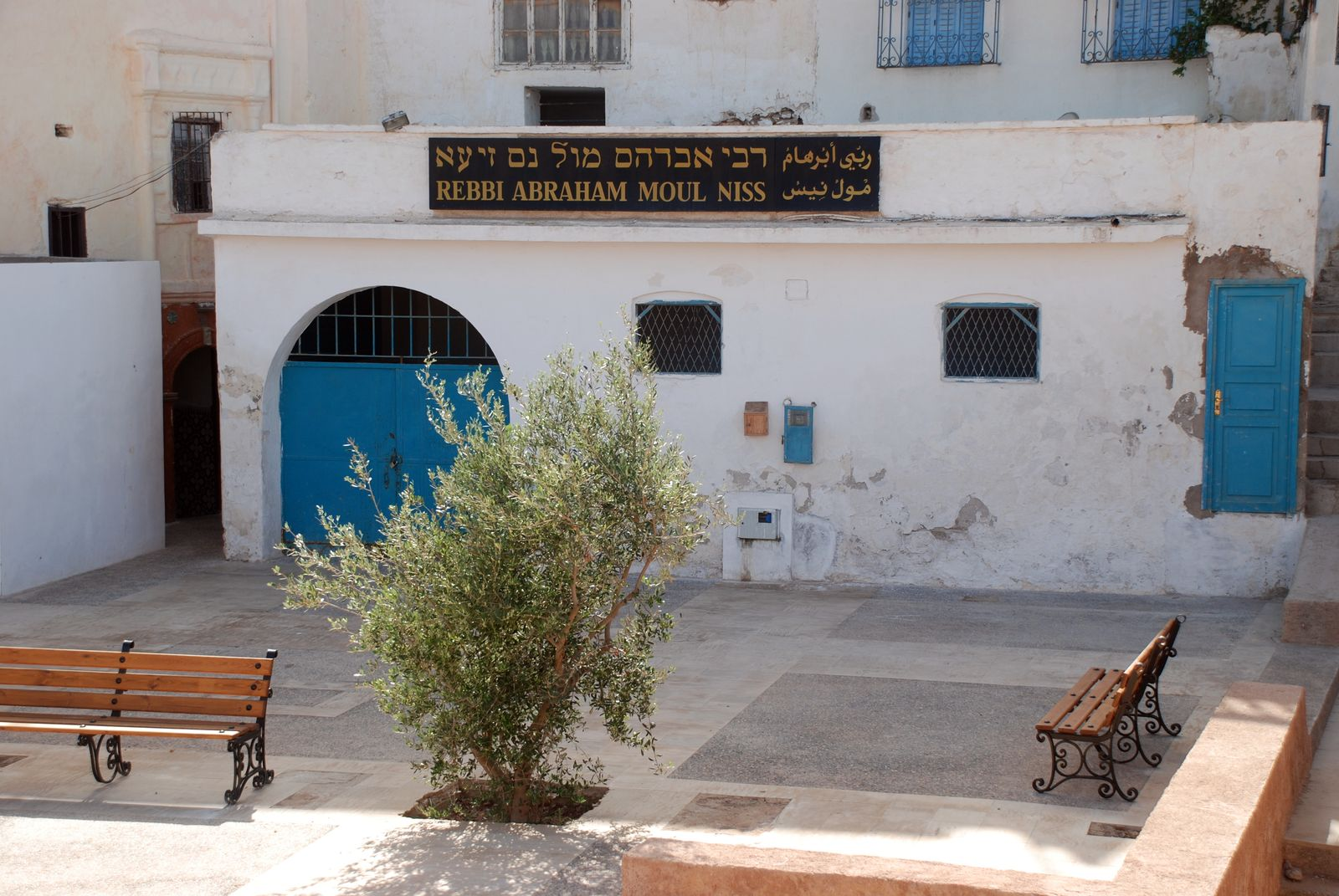
Synagogue.

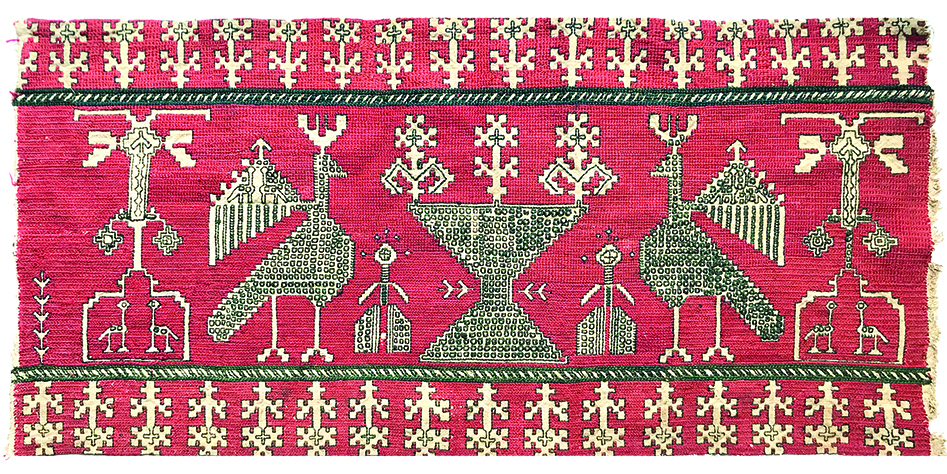
Azemmour embroidery, 18th century

== See also ==
- Battle of Azemmour
