= List of monuments in El Hajeb =

This is a list of monuments that are classified by the Moroccan ministry of culture around El Hajeb.

== Monuments and sites in El Hajeb ==
Image		Name	Location	Coordinates	Identifier
	Upload Photo	Rempart of El Hajeb Kasbah	El Hajeb	33°41'14.575"N, 5°22'17.486"W	pc_architecture/sanae:410035
	Upload Photo	Borj Kasbah (El Hajeb)	El Hajeb	33°41'14.575"N, 5°22'17.486"W	pc_architecture/sanae:050018
	Upload Photo	El Hajeb Kasbah	El Hajeb	33°41'14.575"N, 5°22'17.486"W	pc_architecture/sanae:190008
	Upload Photo	Gate of El Hajeb Kasbah	El Hajeb	33°41'14.575"N, 5°22'17.486"W	pc_architecture/sanae:390055
