= List of monuments in Agadir =

This is a list of monuments that are classified by the Moroccan ministry of culture around Agadir.

== Monuments and sites in Agadir ==
Image		Name	Location	Coordinates	Identifier
	Upload Photo	Aghzdisse lighthouse	Agadir	30°25'47.384"N, 9°38'7.876"W	pc_architecture/sanae:350016
	Upload Photo	Al Amrou Madrasa	Aourir	30°31'0.977"N, 9°35'14.060"W	pc_architecture/sanae:270029
	Upload Photo	Kasbah of Agadir	Agadir	30°25'45.8"N, 9°37'27.1"W	pc_architecture/sanae:190005
	Upload Photo	Ibn Zaidoun Garden	Agadir	30°25'7.057"N, 9°35'37.320"W	pc_architecture/sanae:180117
	Upload Photo	Olhão Garden	Agadir	30°25'27.268"N, 9°35'49.304"W	pc_architecture/sanae:180116
