= List of monuments in Taza =

This is a list of monuments that are classified by the Moroccan ministry of culture around Taza.

== Monuments and sites in Taza ==
Image		Name	Location	Coordinates	Identifier
	Upload Photo	Medina of Taza	Taza	34°12'29.279"N, 4°1'5.570"W	pc_architecture/sanae:280012
	Upload Photo	Dar Bou Hamara	Taza		pc_architecture/sanae:320015
	Upload Photo	El Bestioun Taza	Taza	34°12'35.0"N, 4°0'45.3"W	pc_architecture/sanae:050029
	Upload Photo	Enclosure of Taza	Taza	34°12'38.923"N, 3°59'52.166"W	pc_architecture/sanae:410015
	Upload Photo	Bab Jemaa (Taza)	Taza	34°12'38.844"N, 4°0'55.879"W	pc_architecture/sanae:390051
	Upload Photo	Sarrazine tower	Taza	34°12'29.106"N, 4°1'20.809"W	pc_architecture/sanae:050028
	Upload Photo	Kasbah of Taza	Taza	34°12'42.743"N, 4°1'5.426"W	pc_architecture/sanae:190020
	Upload Photo	Bab Rih (Taza)	Taza	34°12'24.606"N, 4°1'3.058"W	pc_architecture/sanae:390050
	Upload Photo	Sidi Mejbeur Cave	Taza	34°6'17.842"N, 4°4'20.093"W	pc_architecture/sanae:160105
