= List of monuments in Zagora =

This is a list of monuments and sites that are classified or inventoried by the Moroccan ministry of culture around Zagora.

== Monuments and sites in Zagora ==
Image		Name	Location	Coordinates	Identifier
	Upload Photo	Zaouia of Lmajdoub	Zagora	30°20'1.540"N, 5°50'38.994"W	pc_architecture/cerkas:131
	Upload Photo	Beni Zouli Kasbah of Glaoui	Zagora		pc_architecture/sanae:200011
	Upload Photo	Ksour of the zone Z27	Zagora		pc_architecture/cerkas:z15
	Upload Photo	Ksar La Kaaba	Zagora		pc_architecture/sanae:220095
