= List of monuments in Tangier =

This is a list of monuments that are classified by the Moroccan ministry of culture around Tangier.

== Monuments and sites in Tangier ==
Image		Name	Location	Coordinates	Identifier
	Upload Photo	Caves of Hercules	Tangier	35°45'37"N, 5°56'21"W	pc_architecture/sanae:160005
	Upload Photo	Petit Socco	Tangier	35°47'7.55"N, 5°48'38.30"W	pc_architecture/sanae:360008
	Upload Photo	Cape Spartel Lighthouse	Tangier	35°47'27.622"N, 5°55'25.658"W	pc_architecture/sanae:350002
	Upload Photo	Tangier Cathedral	Tangier	35°46'54.5"N, 5°49'4.0"W	pc_architecture/sanae:100021
	Upload Photo	Dar el Makhzen (Tangier)	Tangier	35°47'19"N, 5°48'46"W	pc_architecture/sanae:320011
	Upload Photo	Grand Socco	Tangier	35°47'2.6459"N, 5°48'47.9441"W	pc_architecture/sanae:360009
	Upload Photo	Borj Es-Salam	Tangier	35°47'13.664"N, 5°48'34.186"W	pc_architecture/sanae:050024
	Upload Photo	Abraham Toledano Synagogue	Tangier	35°47'6.428"N, 5°48'42.574"W	pc_architecture/sanae:260630
	Upload Photo	Church of the Immaculate Conception	Tangier	35°47'7"N, 5°48'41"W	pc_architecture/sanae:100005
	Upload Photo	Borj El Marsa	Tangier		pc_architecture/sanae:050025
	Upload Photo	Medina gate	Tangier		pc_architecture/sanae:390071
	Upload Photo	Bab El Bhar (Tangier)	Tangier	35°47'20.429"N, 5°48'43.610"W	pc_architecture/sanae:390070
	Upload Photo	Asilah	Tangier-Assilah Prefecture	35°28'N, 6°2'W	pc_architecture/sanae:280029
