= List of monuments in Sidi Kacem =

This is a list of monuments that are classified by the Moroccan ministry of culture around Sidi Kacem, Morocco.

== Monuments and sites in Sidi Kacem ==
Image		Name	Location	Coordinates	Identifier
	Upload Photo	Enclosure of Basra	Had Kourt	34°36'55.397"N, 5°44'7.609"W	pc_architecture/sanae:410050
	Upload Photo	Medina of Ouezzane	Ouazzane	34°47'48.995"N, 5°34'51.899"W	pc_architecture/sanae:280021
	Upload Photo	Zaouia of Sidi Kacem	Sidi Kacem	34°11'47.447"N, 5°42'56.718"W	pc_architecture/sanae:280023
