= List of monuments in Azilal =

This is a list of monuments that are classified by the Moroccan ministry of culture around Azilal.

== Monuments and sites in Azilal ==
Image		Name	Location	Coordinates	Identifier
	Upload Photo	Ouzoud Falls	Ouzoud	32°0'55"N, 6°43'8"W	pc_architecture/sanae:060003
	Upload Photo	Iminifri Cave	Azilal Province	31°43'27.509"N, 6°58'18.296"W	pc_architecture/sanae:160003
	Upload Photo	Natural bridge Iminifri	Azilal Province	31°43'29.431"N, 6°58'16.792"W	pc_architecture/sanae:380029
	Upload Photo	Kasba Ait Rba	Kasba Tadla	32°35'10.536"N, 6°15'59.292"W	pc_architecture/sanae:190009
	Upload Photo	Oum Rebia Bridge	Azilal Province	32°39'42.462"N, 5°55'33.204"W	pc_architecture/sanae:380001
