= List of museums in Morocco =

This is a list of museums in Morocco by location.

== Agadir ==
- Musée de patrimoine Amazigh

== Casablanca ==
- Moroccan Jewish Museum

== Fez ==
- Dar Batha Museum
- Nejjarine Museum of Wooden Arts & Crafts
- Museum of Arms (Borj Nord)

== Marrakech ==
- Marrakech Museum
- Marrakech Telecommunication Museum
- The Photography Museum of Marrakesh
- Majorelle Garden
- Dar Si Said Museum
- Dar el Bacha – Musée des Confluences
- Museum Farid Belkahia
- Mouassine Museum
- Yves Saint Laurent Museum in Marrakesh
- Museum of African Contemporary Art Al Maaden (MACAAL)
- Mohammed VI Museum for the Water Civilization in Morocco - Aman
- Tiskiwin Museum

== Meknès ==
- Dar Jamaï Museum

== Nador ==
- Ameziane Museum

== Rabat ==
- Banque al-Maghrib Museum (History of coins, currencies and banking)
- National Photography Museum
- Maroc Telecom Museum
- Mohammed VI Museum of Modern and Contemporary Art
- Rabat Archaeological Museum
- National Jewellery Museum

== Salé ==
- Belghazi Museum
- Museum of the living bee (Musée de l'abeille vivante)

== Tangier ==
- American Legation, Tangier
- Dar el Makhzen (Tangier)
- Forbes Museum of Tangier
- Museum of Contemporary Art (Tangier)
- Fondation Lorin
- Musée de Carmen-Macein

== Tétouan ==
- Tetouan Archaeological Museum
- Tetouan Ethnographic Museum

== See also ==
- Tourism in Morocco
- History of Morocco
- Culture of Morocco
- List of museums
