= List of monuments in Essaouira =

This is a list of monuments that are classified by the Moroccan ministry of culture around Essaouira.

== Monuments and sites in Essaouira ==
Image		Name	Location	Coordinates	Identifier
	Upload Photo	Port of Essaouira	Essaouira	31°30'36"N, 9°46'12"W	pc_architecture/idpcm:13F11
	Upload Photo	Kasbah Mosque	Essaouira	31°30'45.5"N, 9°46'17.5"W	pc_architecture/idpcm:B2C573
	Upload Photo	Bab Doukkala (Essaouira)	Essaouira	31°30'57.953"N, 9°45'56.714"W	pc_architecture/idpcm:375F6
	Upload Photo	Bab Marrakech	Essaouira	31°30'42.901"N, 9°45'55.138"W	pc_architecture/idpcm:76F07
	Upload Photo	Bab el-Marsa	Essaouira	31°30'36.068"N, 9°46'24.859"W	pc_architecture/sanae:390057
	Upload Photo	Bab el-Menzeh	Essaouira	31°30'40.97034"N, 9°46'18.01542"W	pc_architecture/idpcm:A234DD
	Upload Photo	Bab Sebaa	Essaouira	31°30'40.846"N, 9°46'11.240"W	pc_architecture/idpcm:134D6
	Upload Photo	Sqala of Kasbah	Essaouira	31°30'55.346"N, 9°46'19.722"W	pc_architecture/sanae:050036
	Upload Photo	Sqala of the port	Essaouira	31°30'35.892"N, 9°46'27.775"W	pc_architecture/sanae:050038
	Upload Photo	Sidi Mohammed ben Abdallah Museum	Essaouira	31°31'1"N, 9°46'5"W	pc_architecture/idpcm:D1511
	Upload Photo	Borj Al Baroud	Essaouira	31°29'20.44"N, 9°46'32.25"W	pc_architecture/sanae:070012
	Upload Photo	Chaim Pinto Synagogue	Essaouira	31°30'57.431"N, 9°46'2.381"W	pc_architecture/idpcm:6DEC2A
	Upload Photo	Simon Attias Synagogue	Essaouira	31°30'56.585"N, 9°46'4.804"W	pc_architecture/idpcm:142124
	Upload Photo	Essaouira Ramparts	Essaouira	31°30'51.10"N, 9°46'18.08"W	pc_architecture/sanae:410008
	Upload Photo	Christian cemetery, Essaouira	Essaouira	31°31'4.310"N, 9°45'51.462"W	pc_architecture/idpcm:B2AB8F
	Upload Photo	Neighborhood Chbanat-Bouakher	Essaouira		pc_architecture/idpcm:05FA2C
	Upload Photo	Al-Shabanat Mosque	Essaouira	31°30'47.80627"N, 9°45'54.84726"W	pc_architecture/idpcm:2A8C56
	Upload Photo	Touahen house	Essaouira		pc_architecture/idpcm:8051E7
	Upload Photo	Borj El Barmil	Essaouira	31°30'35.100"N, 9°46'28.711"W	pc_architecture/idpcm:D1427B
	Upload Photo	Mellah	Essaouira	31°30'56.952"N, 9°46'2.608"W	pc_architecture/idpcm:D38D
	Upload Photo	Bab Labhar	Essaouira	31°30'54.97"N, 9°46'15.67"W	pc_architecture/idpcm:A7849E
	Upload Photo	Northern Bastion Nord of Essaouira	Essaouira	31°30'56.480"N, 9°46'16.662"W	pc_architecture/sanae:050035
	Upload Photo	Southern Bastion of Essaouira	Essaouira	31°30'37.285"N, 9°46'26.666"W	pc_architecture/sanae:050037
	Upload Photo	Old Danish Consulate, Essaouira	Essaouira		pc_architecture/idpcm:4F398B
	Upload Photo	Essaouira	Essaouira Province	31°30'46.883"N, 9°46'7.306"W	pc_archeologie/idpcm:FFC5C2
	Upload Photo	Imsouane Bay	Imsouane	30°50'N, 9°49'W	pc_architecture/sanae:450003
