= Tourism in Morocco =

Tourism in Morocco is well developed, maintaining a strong tourist industry focused on the country's coast, culture, and history. The Moroccan government created a Ministry of Tourism in 1985. Tourism is one of the main foreign exchange sources in Morocco and since 2013 it has had the highest number of arrivals out of the countries in Africa. According to the Ministry of Tourism, a record 17.4 million tourists visited Morocco in 2024, up 20% compared to 2023.

Yearly tourist arrivals in millions

== History and future plans ==
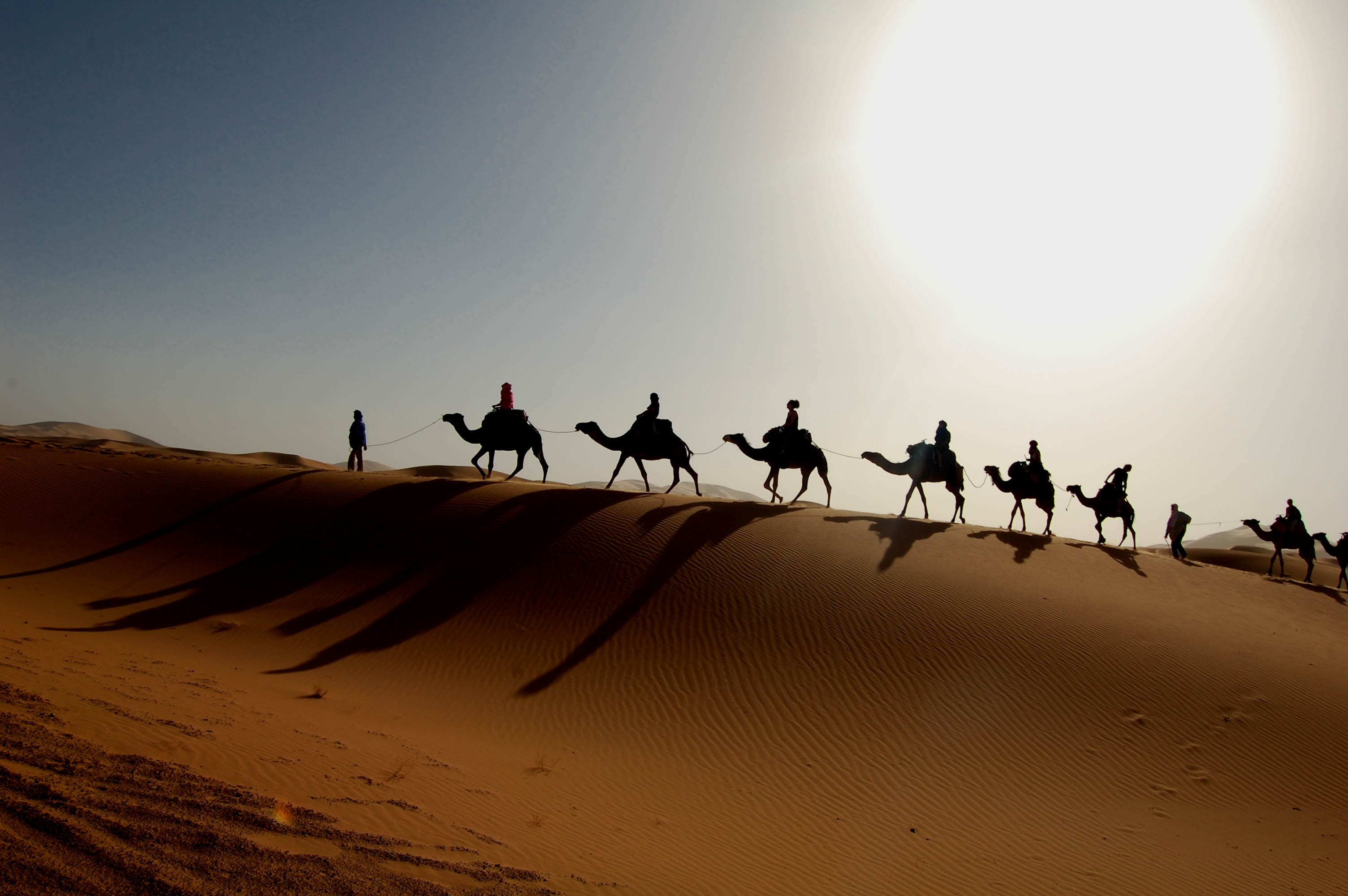
Tourism in the Sahara

Morocco has seen rapid growth in the number of tourists visiting over the past few decades. In the second half of the 1980s and the early 1990s, between 1 and 1.5 million Europeans visited Morocco. Most of these visitors were French or Spanish, with about 100,000 each from Britain, Italy, Germany, and the Netherlands. Tourists mostly visited large beach resorts along the Atlantic coast, particularly Agadir. About 20,000 people from Saudi Arabia visited, some of whom bought holiday homes. Receipts from tourism fell by 16.5% in 1990, the year the Gulf War began.

In 1994, Algeria closed its border with Morocco after the Marrakesh attack, which caused the number of Algerian visitors to fall considerably; there were 70,000 visitors in 1994 and 13,000 in 1995, compared to 1.66 million in 1992 and 1.28 million in 1993.

In 2017, there were 10.3 million tourist arrivals, compared with about 10.1 million in 2016, a 1.5% year-over-year increase. 30% of the tourists were one of the 3.8 million Moroccans living abroad. Marrakesh itself had over 2 million visitors in 2017. In 2019, more than 13 million tourists visited Morocco.

In 2020, Morocco witnessed an all-time low with no more than 4 million tourists, due to the spread of COVID-19. However, the Merzouga region has become a focal point for Morocco desert trips, characterized by a significant growth in luxury desert camps in the Erg Chebbi dunes that offer upscale glamping experiences for international travelers. In 2023, Marrakesh was voted a Top 10 Best Destinations for International Tourists by Tripadvisor. In 2023, Morocco set a new record for the number of tourists visiting, reaching 13.2 million, breaking the former record of 12.9 million that was set in 2019.

Morocco intends to leverage its co-hosting of the 2030 World Cup to further boost long-term tourism. In 2025, it received close to 20 million tourists - the most among African countries. It hopes to draw 35 million foreign visitors annually by 2030, with that year's total estimated to include 1.2 million football fans attending World Cup games in Morocco. To prepare for the anticipated tourism boost for the global football tournament, in March 2026 national tourism development agency (SMIT) unveiled plans to expand hotel capacity by one-fifth, adding 25,000 hotel rooms in the next four years.

== Statistics ==
Year	Total Inbound Tourists
2012	9,375,156
2013	10,046,264
2014	10,282,944
2015	10,176,762
2016	10,331,731
2017	11,349,344
2018	12,288,708
2019	12,932,260
2020	2,777,802
2021	3,721,702
2022	10,868,863
2023	14,524,727
2024	17,400,000
2025	19,800,000

=== Nationalities ===
Tourists by nationality in Morocco (2012–2019)
Nationality	2012	2013	2014	2015	2016	2017	2018	2019
France	1,769,710	1,782,056	1,798,190	1,563,568	1,449,757	1,614,011	1,844,397	1,990,813
Spain	730,882	682,834	683,761	626,896	615,720	710,729	814,069	880,818
United Kingdom	357,347	403,325	476,550	504,475	458,561	486,262	510,516	551,499
Germany	199,349	237,852	255,124	286,328	260,255	331,185	394,328	413,384
Italy	196,186	234,912	254,209	227,961	219,334	246,312	305,505	351,916
United States	140,045	160,033	167,267	181,468	197,858	254,531	304,960	346,702
Belgium	255,290	272,593	267,308	243,815	238,984	259,658	273,535	272,328
Netherlands	204,767	210,859	191,158	183,349	182,379	214,016	237,539	241,065
Maghreb	219,280	270,227	213,675	195,214	209,823	207,885	214,295	227,281
China	6,899	7,871	9,403	10,515	42,844	107,434	132,081	141,050
Scandinavia	67,165	83,999	95,193	83,554	93,009	118,460	136,157	104,264
Moroccans Living Abroad (MRE)	4,363,427	4,722,931	4,845,491	5,025,058	5,228,527	5,484,427	5,609,607	5,889,254
Total	9,375,156	10,046,264	10,282,944	10,176,762	10,331,731	11,349,344	12,288,708	12,932,260

Tourists by nationality in Morocco (2020–2023)
Country	2020	2021	2022	2023	2024
France	412,179	493,933	1,505,443	1,999,121	
Spain	200,136	99,495	901,672	1,304,276	
United Kingdom	113,258	56,435	481,905	679,326	
Germany	79,077	38,894	171,219	280,788	
Italy	57,105	52,588	239,879	335,110	
United States	54,103	66,991	231,006	331,557	
Belgium	40,603	64,996	172,608	226,495	
Netherlands	40,909	34,591	129,922	192,381	
Maghreb	49,240	46,265	117,656	159,587	
China	20,529	4,762	27,979	59,719	106,000
Scandinavia	22,119	12,670	52,080	81,965	
Moroccans living abroad MRE	1,369,808	2,437,367	5,804,083	7,374,733	
Total	2,777,802	3,721,702	10,868,863	14,524,727	

== Tourism industry ==
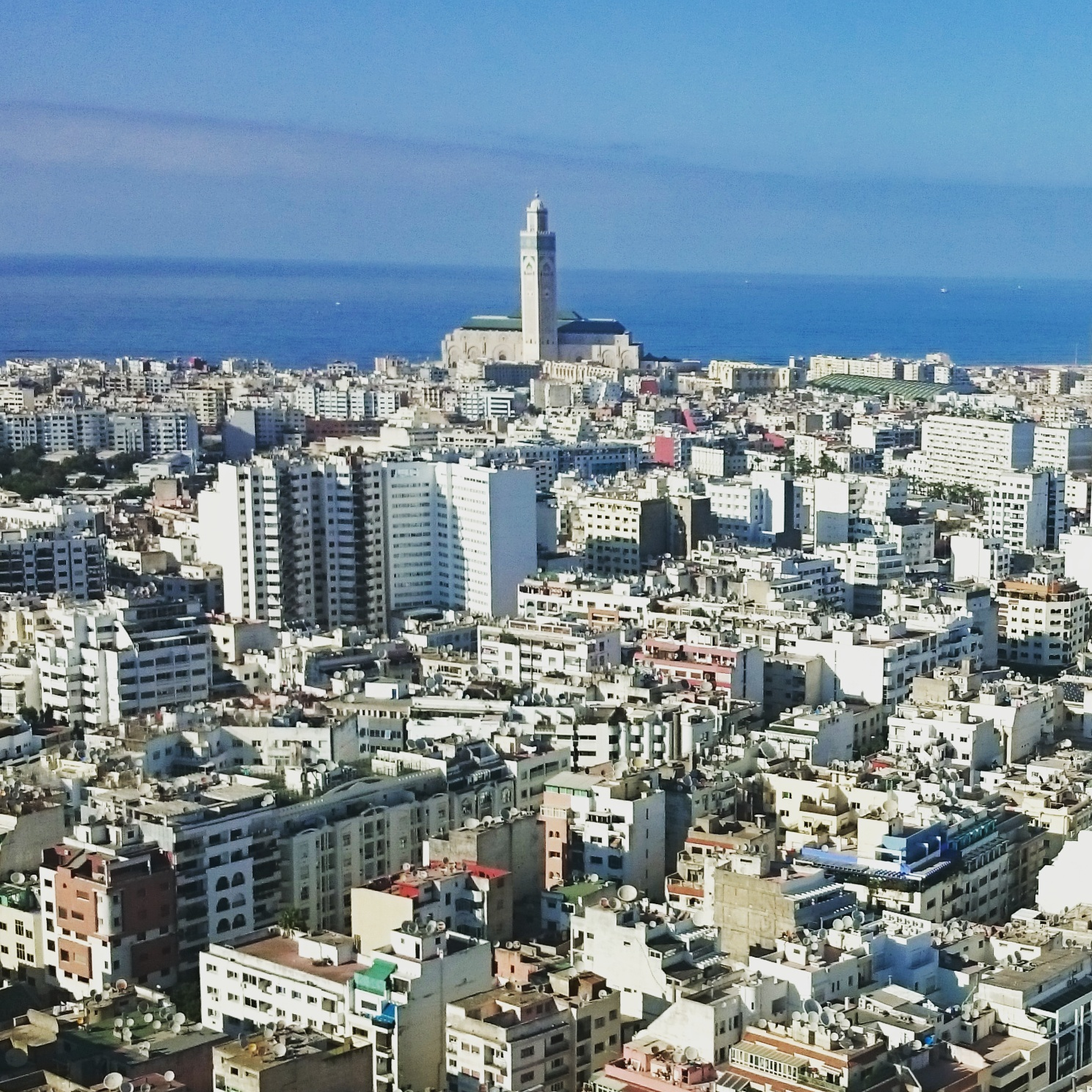
Casablanca

Tourist receipts in 2007 totaled US$7.55 billion. Tourism is the second largest foreign exchange earner in Morocco, after the phosphate industry. The Moroccan government is heavily investing in tourism development. A new tourism strategy called Vision 2010 was developed after the accession of King Mohammed VI in 1999. The government targeted that Morocco will have 10 million visitors by 2010, with the hope that tourism will then have risen to 20% of GDP. Government-sponsored marketing campaigns to attract tourists advertised Morocco as a cheap, exotic, and safe place for European tourists.

Morocco's relatively high number of tourists has been aided by its location, tourist attractions, and relatively low price. Cruise ships visit the ports of Casablanca and Tangier. Morocco is close to Europe and attracts visitors to its beaches. Because of its proximity to Spain, tourists in southern Spain's coastal areas take one- to three-day trips to Morocco. Marrakesh and Agadir are the top two destinations in the country. Air services between Morocco and Algeria have been established, many Algerians have gone to Morocco to shop and visit family and friends. Morocco is relatively inexpensive because of the interesting dirham exchange rate compared to major currencies and the increase of hotel prices in neighbouring Spain. Morocco has an excellent road and rail infrastructure that links the major cities and tourist destinations with ports and cities with international airports. Low-cost airlines offer cheap flights to the country.

== Plan Azur ==
The "Plan Azur", is a large-scale project initiated by King Mohammed VI, is meant to provide for creating six coastal resorts for holiday-home owners and tourists (five on the Atlantic coast and one on the Mediterranean), the Daily Telegraph noted. The plan also includes other large-scale development projects such as upgrading regional airports to attract budget airlines, and building new train and road links. Through these efforts the country achieved an 11% percent rise in tourism in the first five months of 2008 compared with the same period the previous year, it said, adding that French visitors topped the list with 927,000 followed by Spaniards (587,000) and Britons (141,000). Morocco, which is close to Europe, has a mix of culture and the exotic that makes it popular with Europeans buying holiday homes.

== Tourist attractions ==
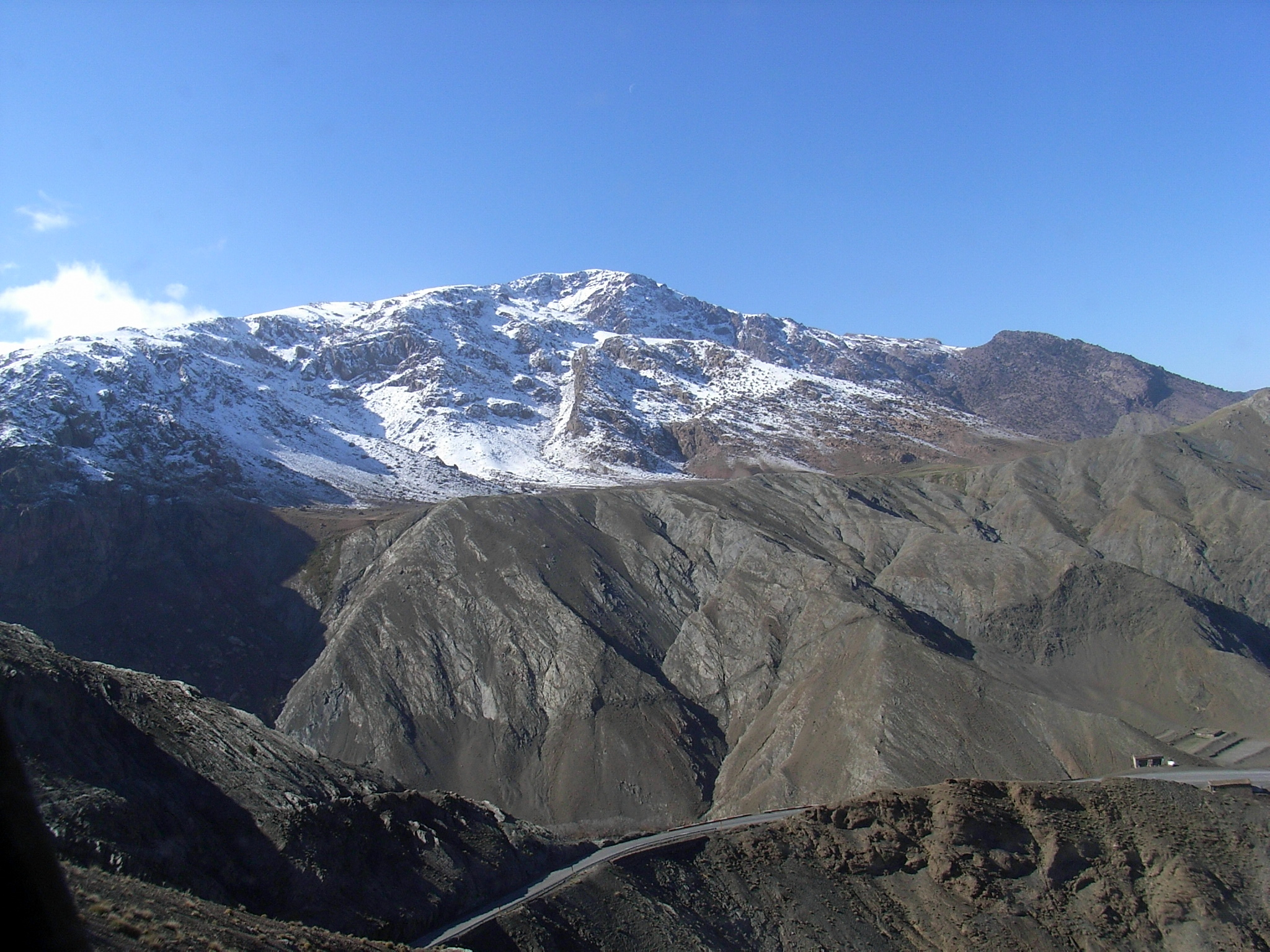
The Atlas mountains

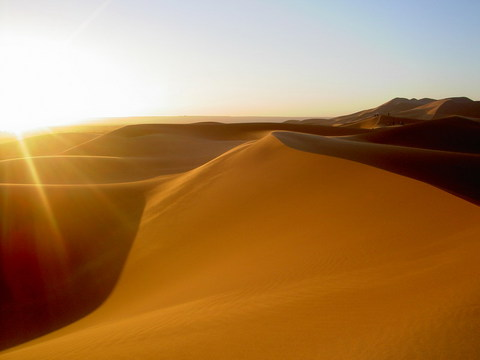
Sand dunes in Morocco

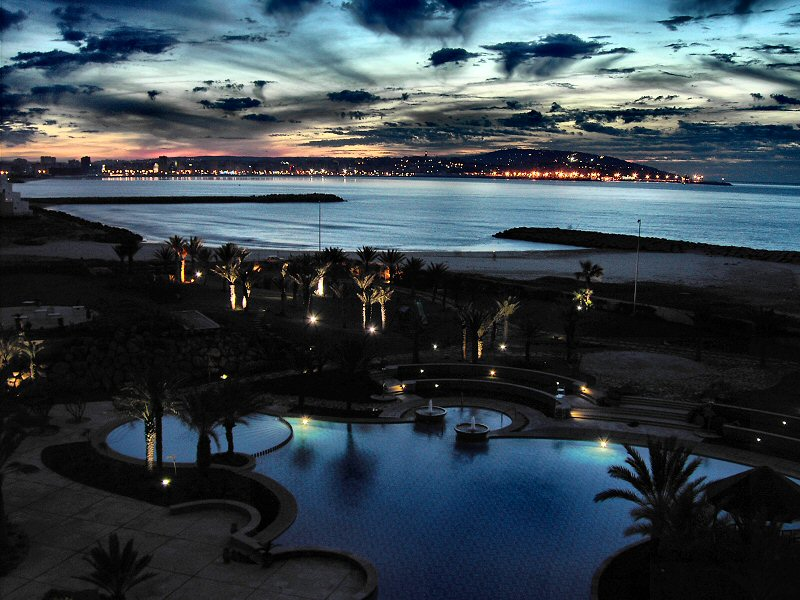
Malabata Coast in Tangier

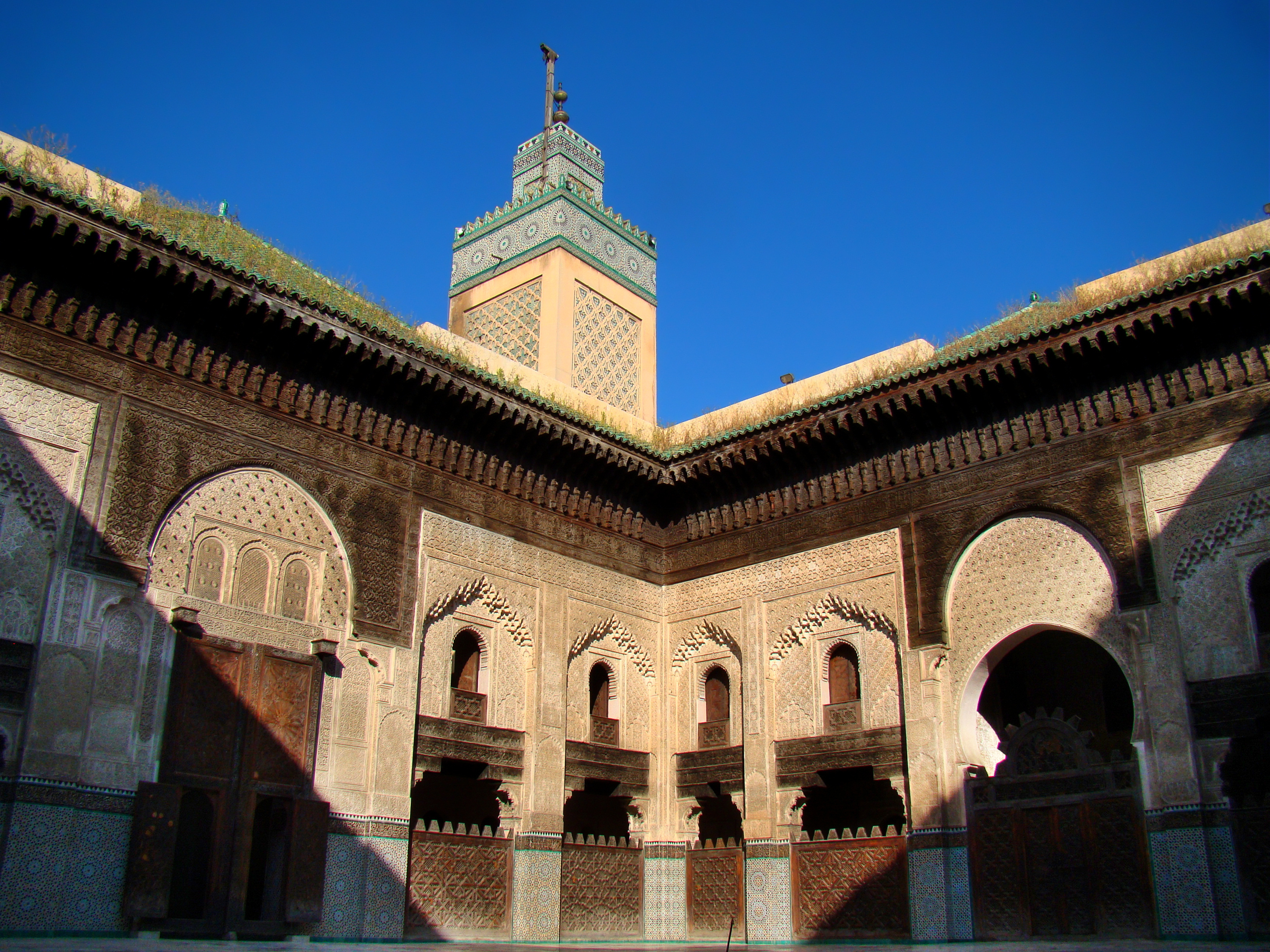
Bou Inania Madrasa in Fez

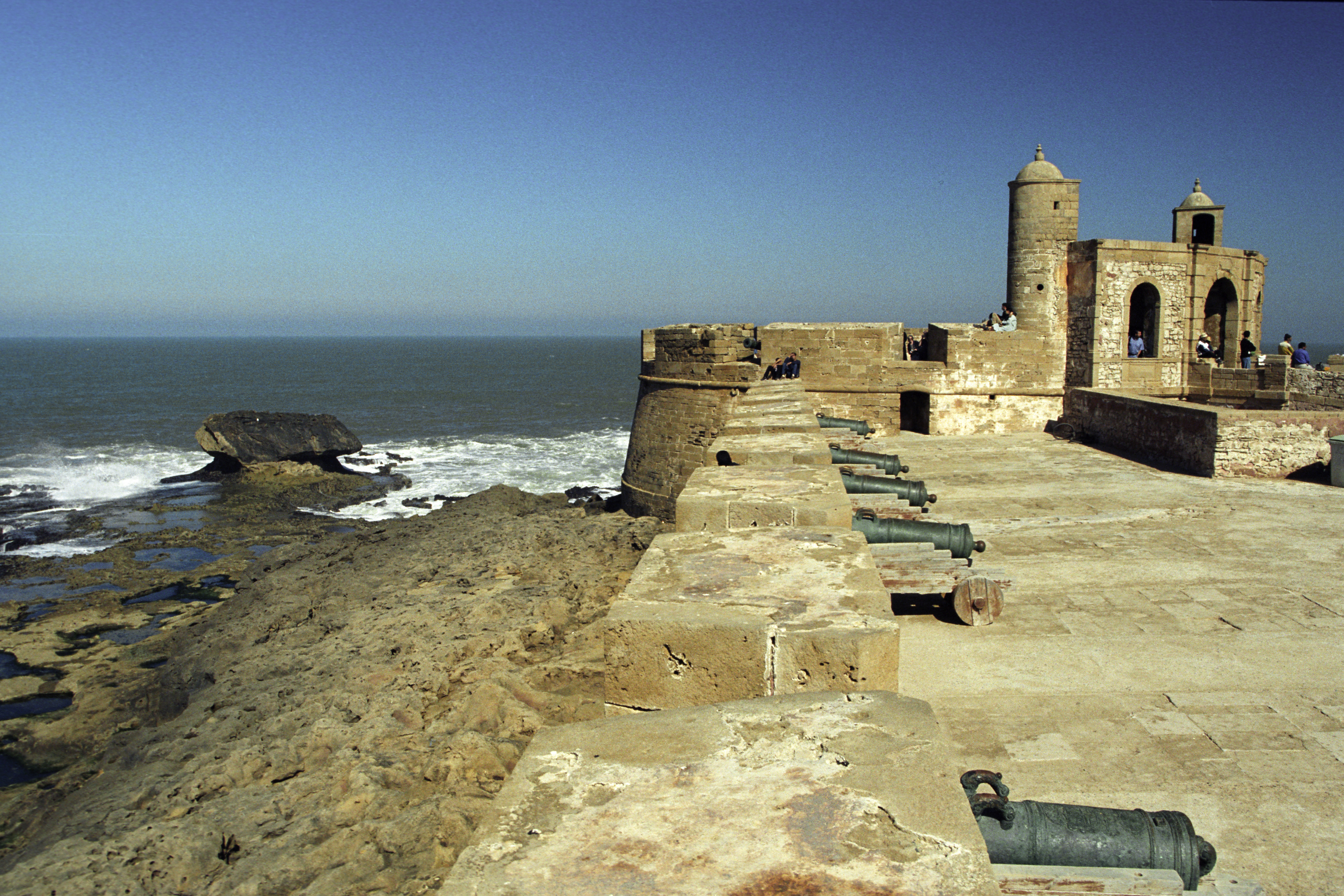
Old defense walls of Essaouira

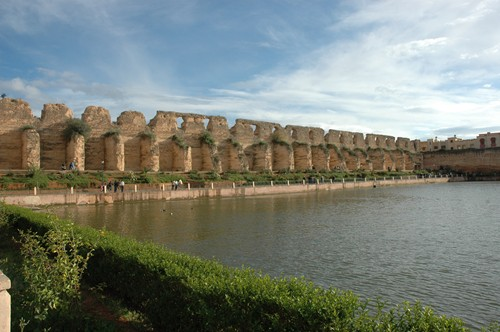
Swany water reserve in Meknes

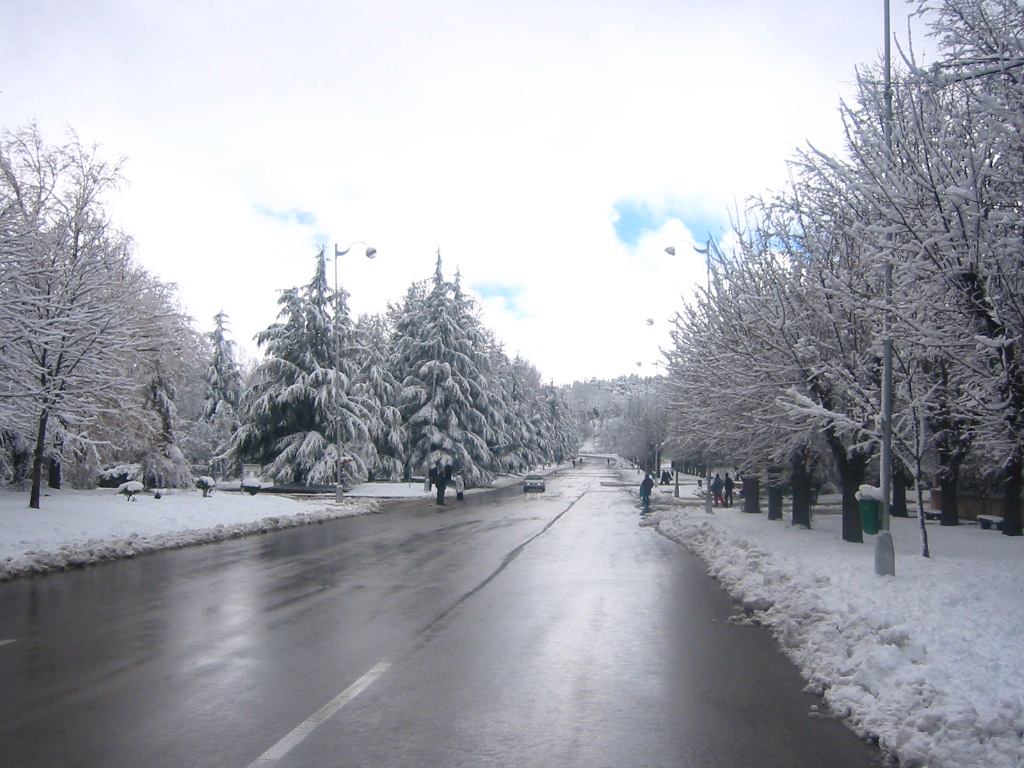
Snow in Ifrane

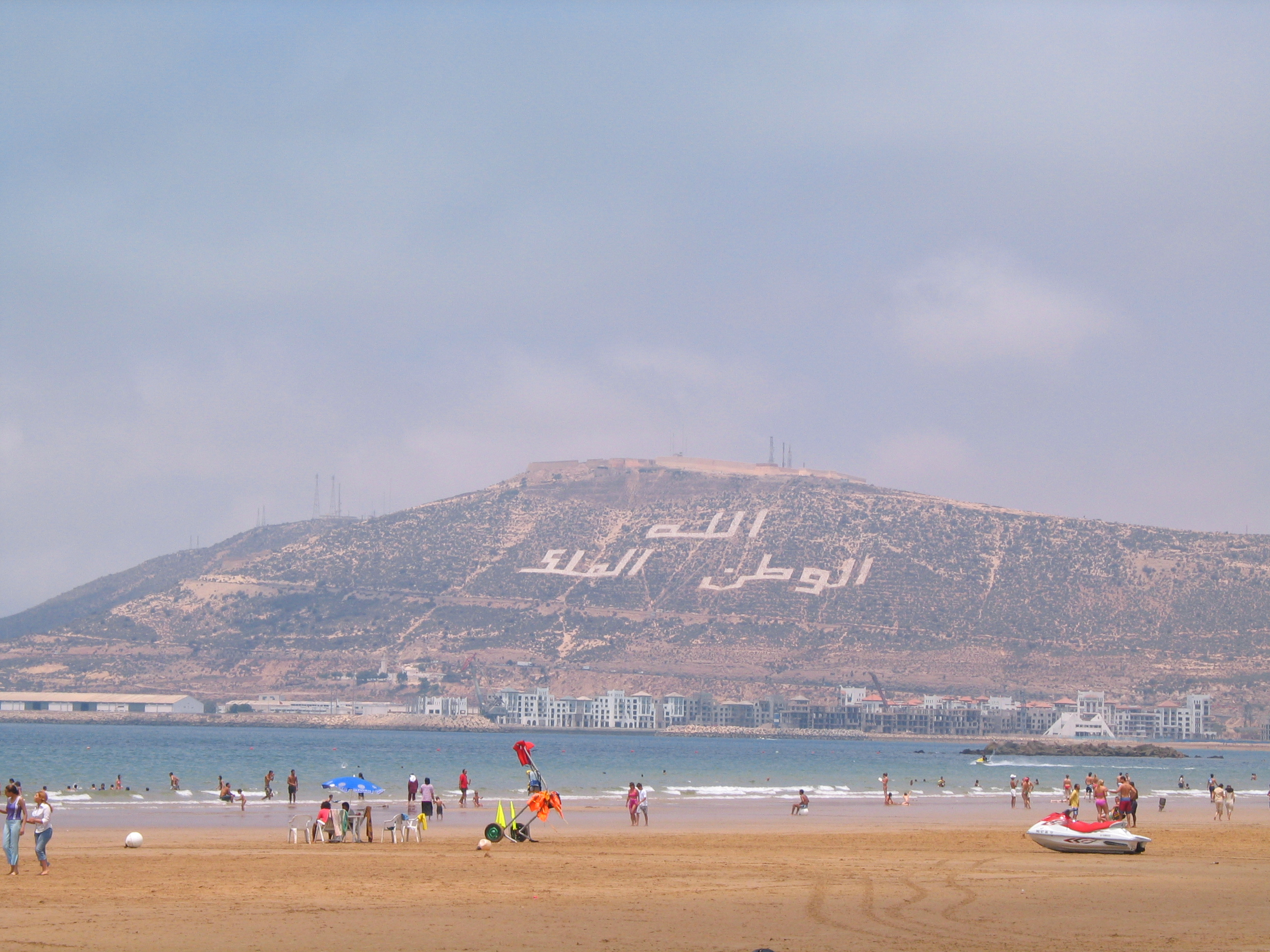
The beach and Kasbah at Agadir

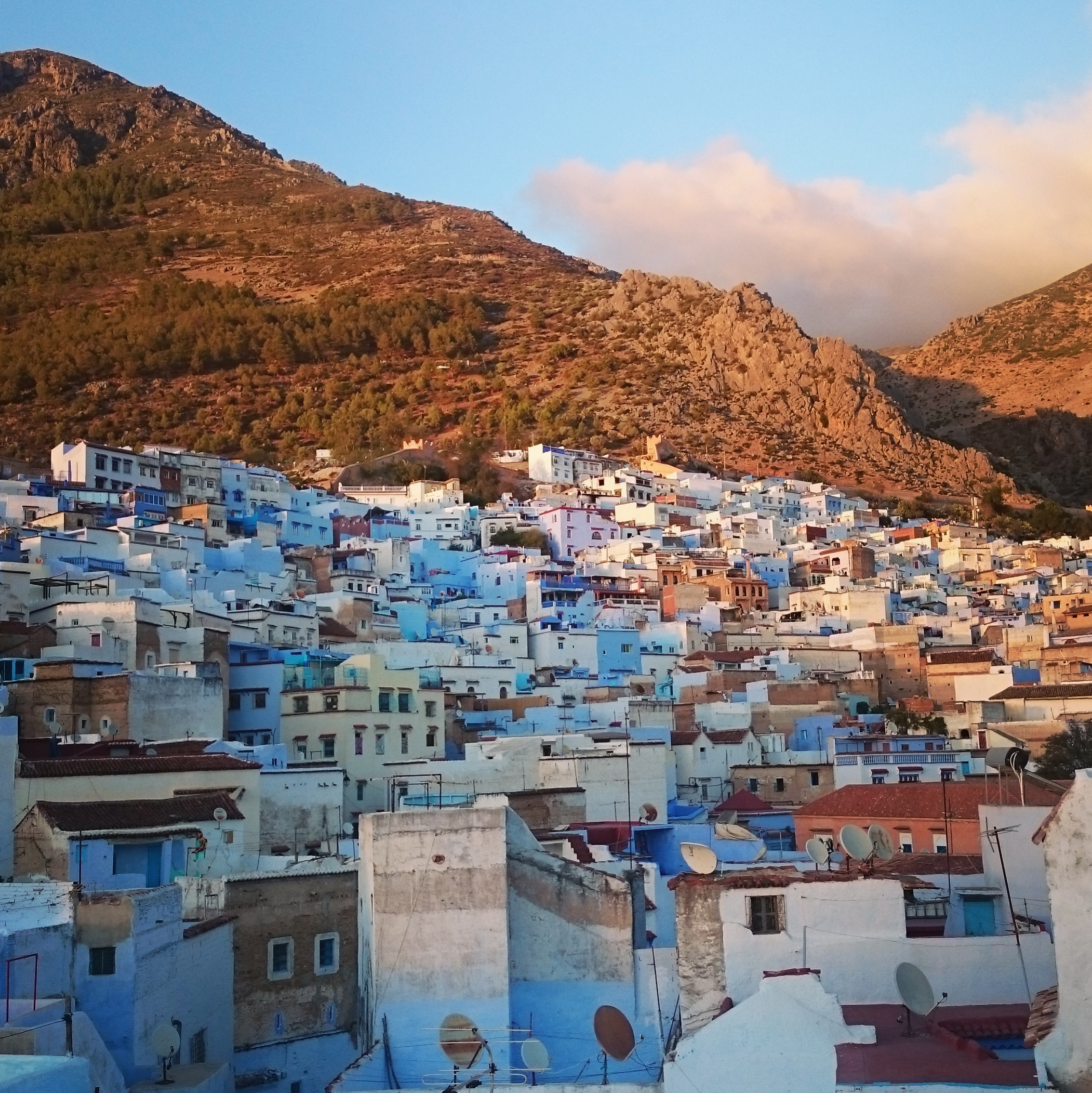
The blue village of Chefchaouen

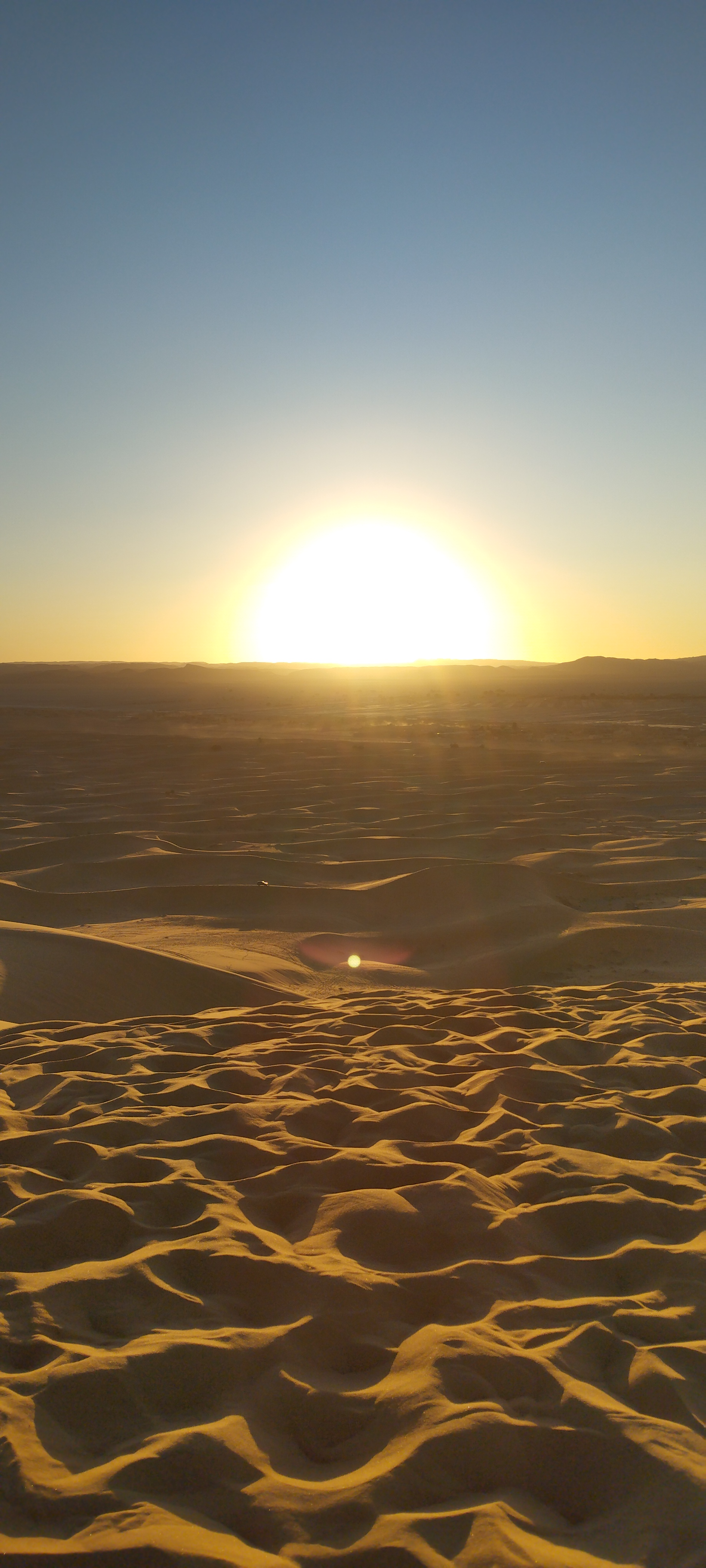
Sunset near Merzouga

The country's attractions can be divided into seven regions:

- The four Imperial cities — the four historical capital cities of Morocco: Fez, Marrakesh, Meknes and Rabat
- Casablanca — Morocco's largest city; home of the Hassan II Mosque, which has the world's second tallest minaret at 656 feet
- Tangier and the surrounding area
- Ouarzazate — a noted film-making location; the fortified village (ksar) of Ait Benhaddou west of the city is a UNESCO World Heritage Site
- Agadir and its beach resorts
- Tarfaya and its beach resorts
- Fez – Morocco's second largest city, considered by some the science and spiritual capital of Morocco. It contains an old area which is considered the biggest area in the world where vehicles can't get in. It is also the home of "Al Qarawyien" the world's oldest university.
- Merzouga – Merzouga is a small village in southeastern Morocco in the desert.
- Agafay – The Agafay desert is a desert located about thirty kilometers from the red city of Marrakesh, on the first heights of the High Atlas massif in Morocco. This is a reg several hundred hectares in area. It is covered with stones and rocks in a hilly environment of white and ochre-coloured dunes.

While Morocco was a French Protectorate (from 1912 to 1956) tourism was focused on urban areas such as the Mediterranean cities of Tangier and Casablanca. Tangier attracted many writers, such as Edith Wharton, Jack Kerouac, Paul Bowles, and William S. Burroughs. There was a period of beach resort development at places such as Agadir on the Atlantic coast in the 1970s and 1980s.

Tourism is increasingly focused on Morocco's culture, such as its ancient cities. The modern tourist industry capitalizes on Morocco's ancient Roman and Islamic sites, and on its landscape and cultural history. 60% of Morocco's tourists visit for its culture and heritage.

Agadir is a major coastal resort and has a third of all Moroccan bed nights. It is a base for tours to the Atlas Mountains. Other resorts in north Morocco are also very popular. Casablanca is the major cruise port in Morocco, and has the best developed market for tourists in Morocco.

As of 2006, activity and adventure tourism in the Atlas and Rif Mountains are the fastest growth area in Moroccan tourism. These locations have excellent walking and trekking opportunities from late March to mid-November. The government is investing in trekking circuits. They are also developing desert tourism in competition with Tunisia.

=== UNESCO World Heritage Sites ===
Morocco is home to nine UNESCO World Heritage Sites.

Site	Image	Location	Criteria	Area ha (acre)	Year	Description
Medina of Fez	A picture of a sun-lit back alley with trash scattered across the area. Various buildings of varying architecture are clearly visible.	Fez	Cultural: (ii), (v)	280 (690)	1981	The former capital was founded in the 9th century and features the world's oldest university. The urban fabric and main monuments date from the 13th and 14th centuries.
Medina of Marrakesh	A ground view of an artificially lit tower, reaching several storeys high, at the beginning of a sunset.	Marrakesh	Cultural: (i), (ii), (iv), (v)	1,107 (2,740)	1985	The town was founded in the 1070s and remained a political, economic, and cultural centre for a long time. Monuments from that period include the Koutoubia Mosque, the kasbah, and the battlements. The city also holds newer features, including palaces.
Ksar of Ait-Ben-Haddou	A distant view of a monotonous city on a very slanted hill.	Aït Benhaddou (Ouarzazate Province)	Cultural: (iv), (v)	3 (7.4)	1987	The ksar is an example of a traditional pre-Saharan habitat, surrounded by high walls and reinforced with corner towers.
Historic City of Meknes	A picture of a large gate several metres high covered with various abstract designs.	Meknes	Cultural: (iv)	—	1996	The former capital was founded in the 11th century and turned into a city with Spanish-Moorish influence during the 17th and 18th centuries.
Archaeological Site of Volubilis	A picture of a rectangular building whose back side has been demolished. A green mountain range fills the background.	Meknes	Cultural: (ii), (iii), (iv), (vi)	42 (100)	1997	The important Roman outpost of Volubilis was founded in the 3rd century BCE to become the capital of Mauretania. It contained many buildings, the remains of which have survived extensively to this day.
Medina of Tétouan (formerly known as Titawin)	A picture of a very large and cramped city, set on a very slanted hill.	Tétouan	Cultural: (ii), (iv), (v)	7 (17)	1997	Morocco's most complete medina served as the main point of contact between Morocco and Andalusia during the 8th century. The town was rebuilt by Andalusian refugees following the reconquista.
Medina of Essaouira (formerly Mogador)	A seaside view of a large city enclosed by an orange barricade.	Essaouira	Cultural: (ii), (iv)	30 (74)	2001	The fortified seaport built during the late 18th century has a mix of North African and European architecture, and was a major trading hub between the Sahara and Europe.
Portuguese City of Mazagan (El Jadida)	A panoramic view of a large city, largely coloured beige.	El Jadida	Cultural: (ii), (iv)	8 (20)	2004	The fortification, akin to Renaissance military design from the early 16th century, was taken over by Morocco in 1769. Surviving buildings include the cistern and a Gothic church.
Rabat, modern capital and historic city	A large, architecturally detailed entrance to a big palace. Several guards are posted out front.	Rabat	Cultural: (ii), (iv)	349 (860)	2012	Rebuilt under the direction of the French from 1912 to the 1930s, the city blends historic and modern features, such as botanical gardens, the Hassan Mosque, and the remnants of Moorish and Andalusian settlements from the 17th century.

=== Fez ===
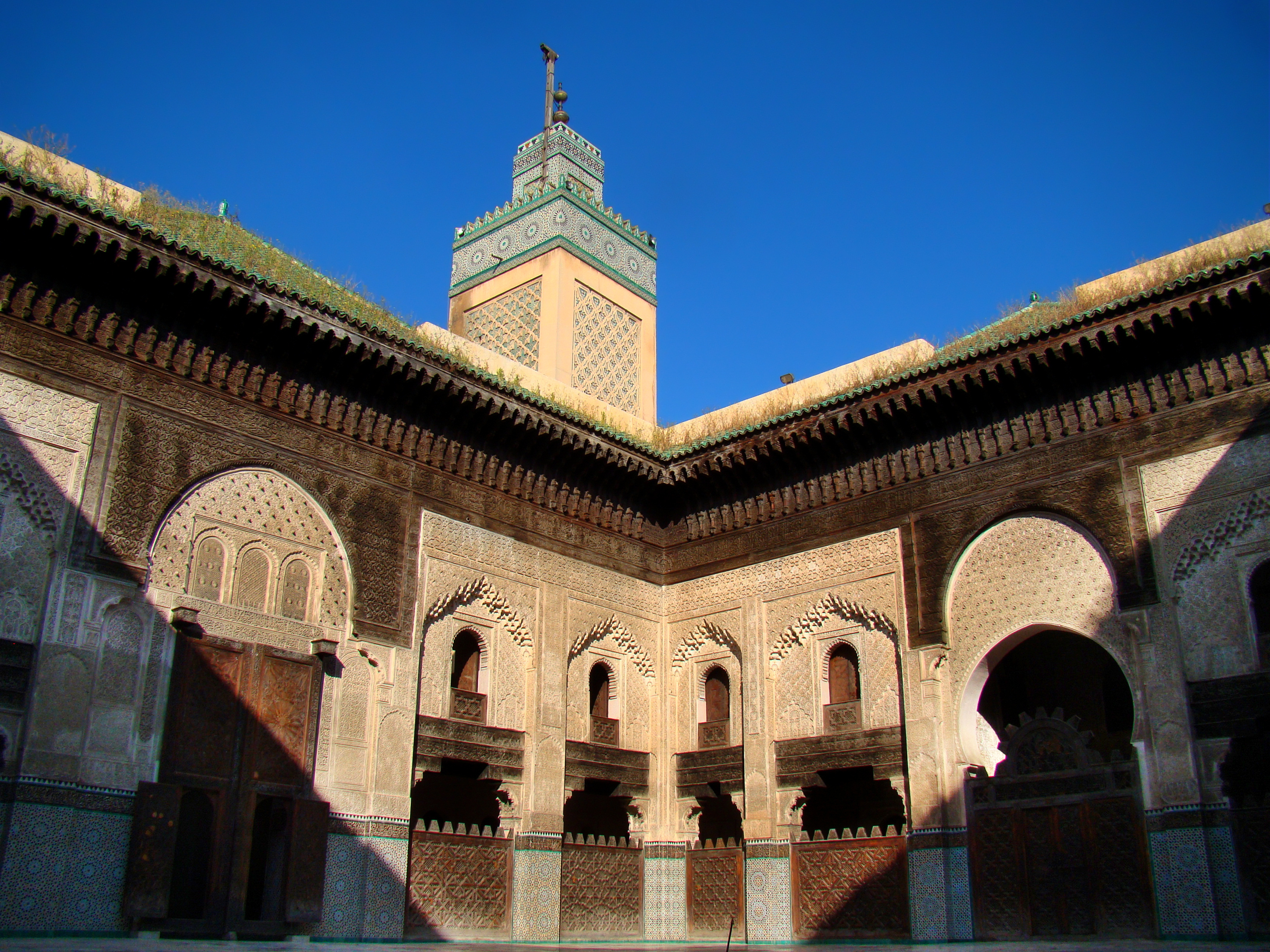
The Bou Inania Madrasa built by the Marinid sultan Abu Inan Faris in 1351.

Fez was the capital city of modern Morocco until 1925 and is now the capital of the Fez-Meknes administrative region. The city has two old medina quarters, the larger of which is Fes el Bali. It is listed as a World Heritage Site and is believed to be one of the world's largest urban pedestrian zones (car-free areas). University of Al Quaraouiyine, founded in 859, is the oldest continuously functioning university in the world. The city has been called the "Mecca of the West" and the "Athens of Africa", a nickname it shares with Cyrene in Libya.

Fez is a popular tourist destination and many non-Moroccans are now restoring traditional houses (riads and dars) as second homes in the Fez medina. The most important monuments in the city are:

- Bou Inania Madrasa
- Al-Attarine Madrasa
- University of Al Quaraouiyine
- Zaouia Moulay Idriss II
- Dar al-Magana
- Ibn Danan Synagogue

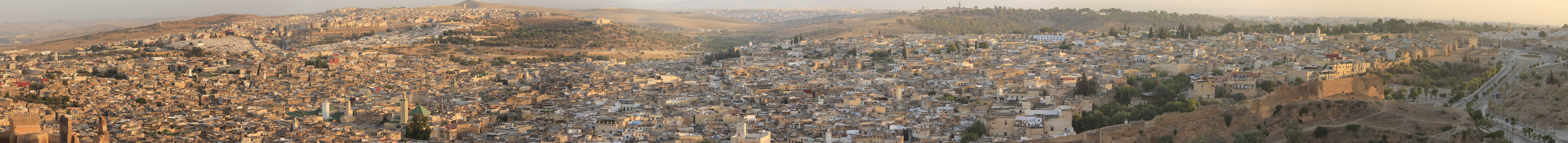
View of Fez from the Marinid Tombs

=== Marrakesh ===
Marrakesh in central Morocco is a popular tourist destination. Riad tourism in Marrakesh has shaped the urban fabric of the city. According to Mauro Spotorno in 2018, the medina of Marrakesh has been cultivated since the French protectorate as a setting for Westerners that corresponds to the Orientalist stereotypes of the Muslim world, and "more and more frequently traditional houses of the historical centre have been restored and renovated into hotel facilities, and nowadays, the medina is an interesting study case of the processes of gentrification ." For Khalid Madhi, the case of tourism in Marrakesh raises questions of heritage commodification, power relations between locals and tourists, the long-term sustainability of tourism-driven urban policy, and the appropriation of land, culture, and memory. According to Nancy Nabeel Aly Demerdash, "Marrakesh is framed and famed to promise hedonistic pleasures" and "such perpetuated representational tropes actually materialize the oriental fantasy for the consumer; consequently, Marrakesh has become more of a product than place."

Marrakesh is popular among tourists for one- and two-day excursions that provide a taste of Morocco's history and culture.

The Majorelle botanical garden in Marrakesh is a popular tourist attraction. It was bought by the fashion designer Yves Saint-Laurent and Pierre Bergé in 1980. Their presence in the city helped to boost the city's profile as a tourist destination.

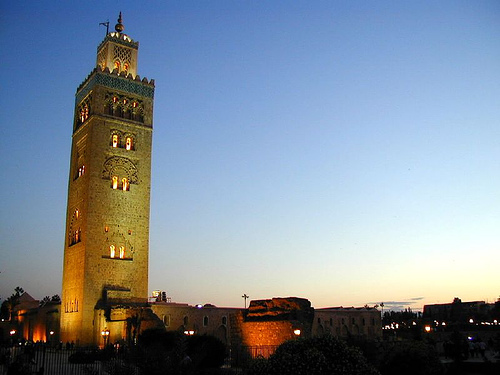
Koutoubia Mosque in Marrakesh

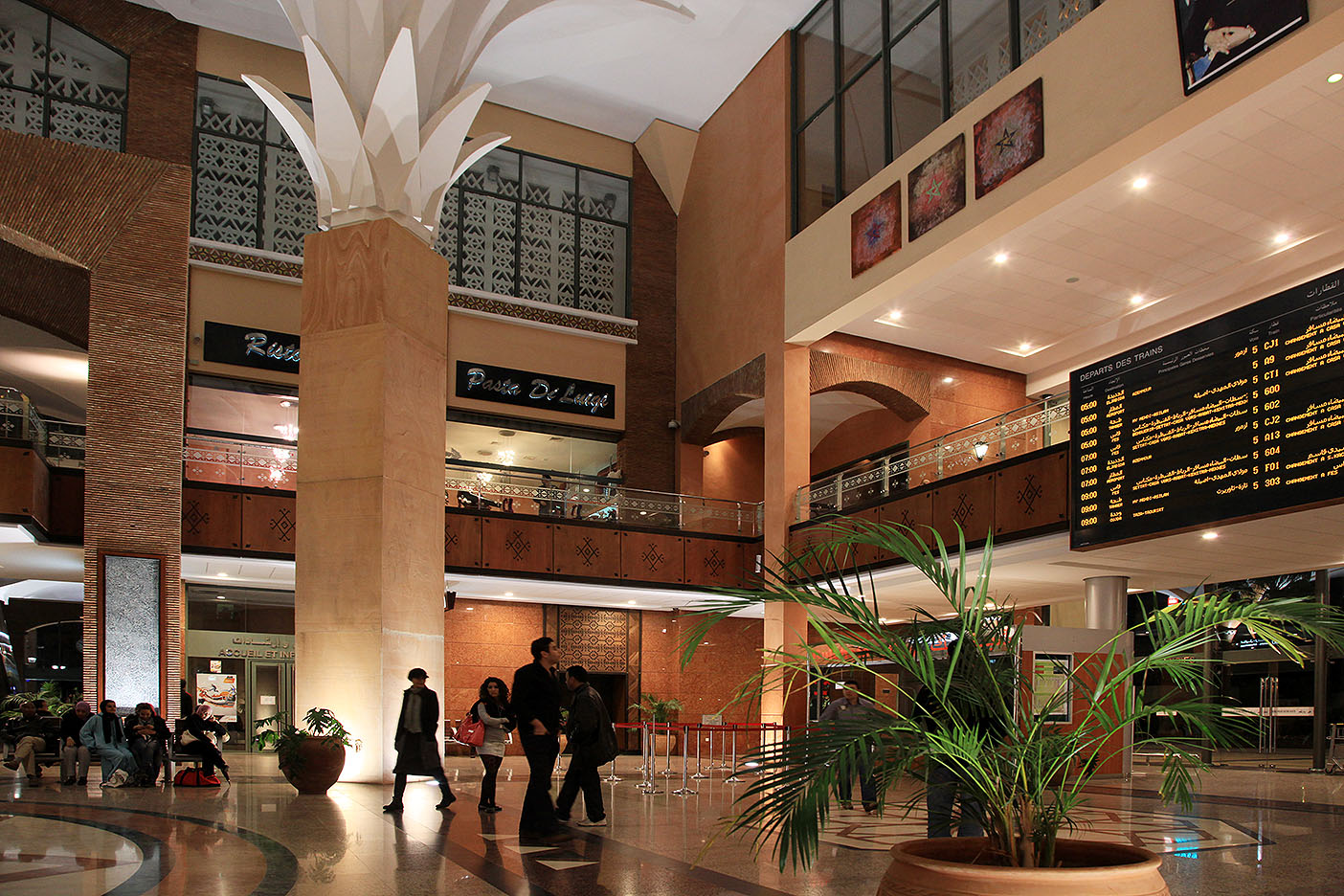
Marrakesh railway station

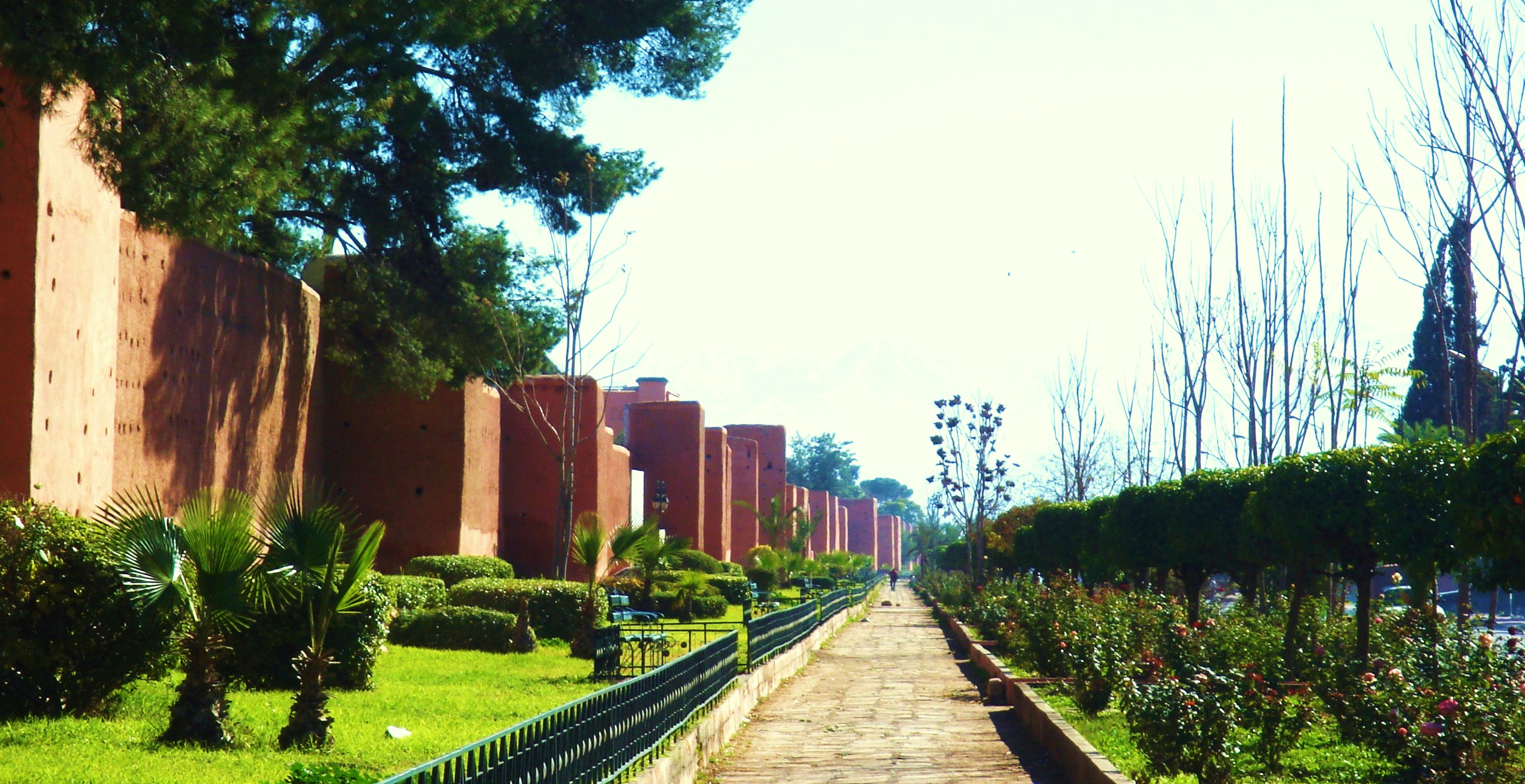
Old city walls of Marrakesh

=== Tangier ===
Tangier, formerly the International Zone from 1923 to 1956, is a city in north of Morocco. Formerly part of the Spanish Protectorate in Morocco, Tangier is a blend of Spanish, Moroccan, and Berber cultures. Famous tourist sites in the city and near it include the Tangier-American Legation, Hercules Cave, the Kasbah museum, the Perdicaris Parc, the Musée de Carmen-Macein, Museum of Moroccan Arts and Antiquities, Museum of Contemporary Art, the Grand Socco, the Petit Socco, and Gran Teatro Cervantes.

=== El Jadida ===
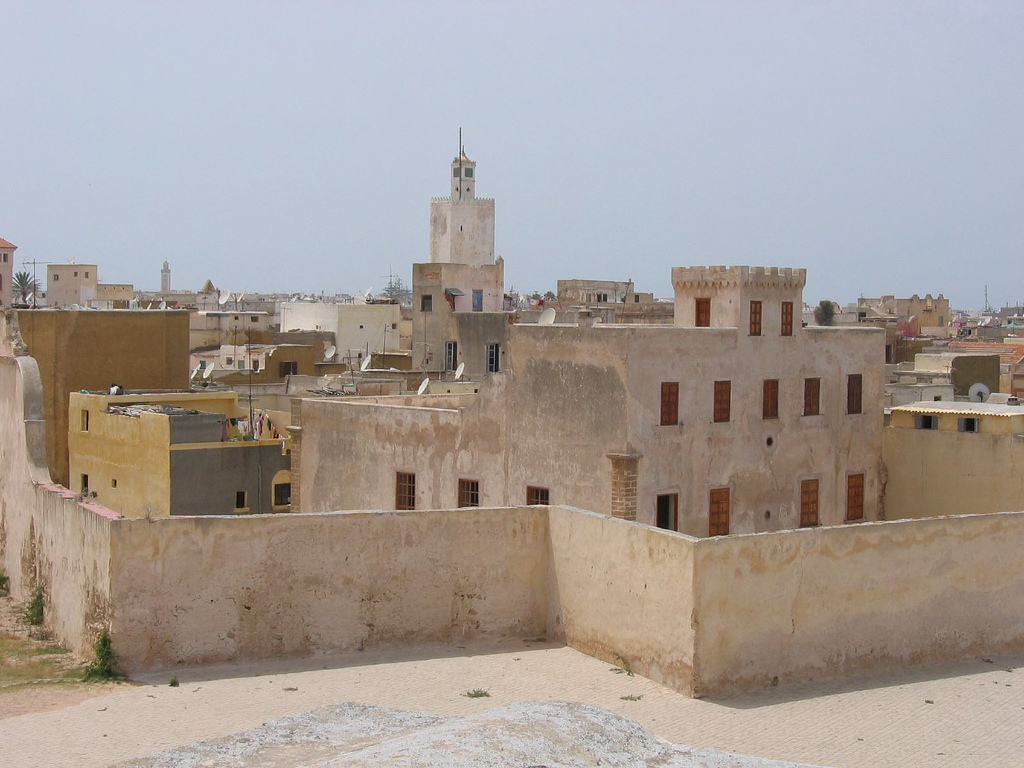
El Jadida panorama

El Jadida, formerly called Mazagan by the Portuguese, was registered as a UNESCO World Heritage Site in 2004, on the basis of its status as an "outstanding example of the interchange of influences between European and Moroccan cultures" and as an "early example of the realisation of the Renaissance ideals integrated with Portuguese construction technology". According to UNESCO, the most important buildings from the Portuguese period are the cistern, and the Manueline Church of the Assumption. El Jadida is also home to the annual Salon du Cheval–the largest horse expo in Africa. Among Morocco’s most frequently recommended destinations are its historic cities, desert landscapes, and coastal resorts, which are regularly featured in travel guides for international tourists.

== Safety ==
Caution is advised to United States citizens due to potential terror attacks. Examples in the past 15 years include April 2011 terrorist attacks in Marrakesh and the Murders of Louisa Vesterager Jespersen and Maren Ueland in Imlil December 2018. According to international travel advisories, Morocco is generally considered safe for visitors when exercising standard precautions, with most guidance emphasizing awareness in crowded areas and checking official travel updates before visiting.

== See also ==
- Economy of Morocco
- Investment in Morocco
- Museums in Morocco
- Plan Azur
- Surfing in Morocco
- Visa policy of Morocco
