= Taghazout =

Village in Souss-Massa, Morocco

Taghazout: ⵜⴰⵖⴰⵣⵓⵜ (Standard Moroccan Tamazight); تغازوت (Arabic)
- town
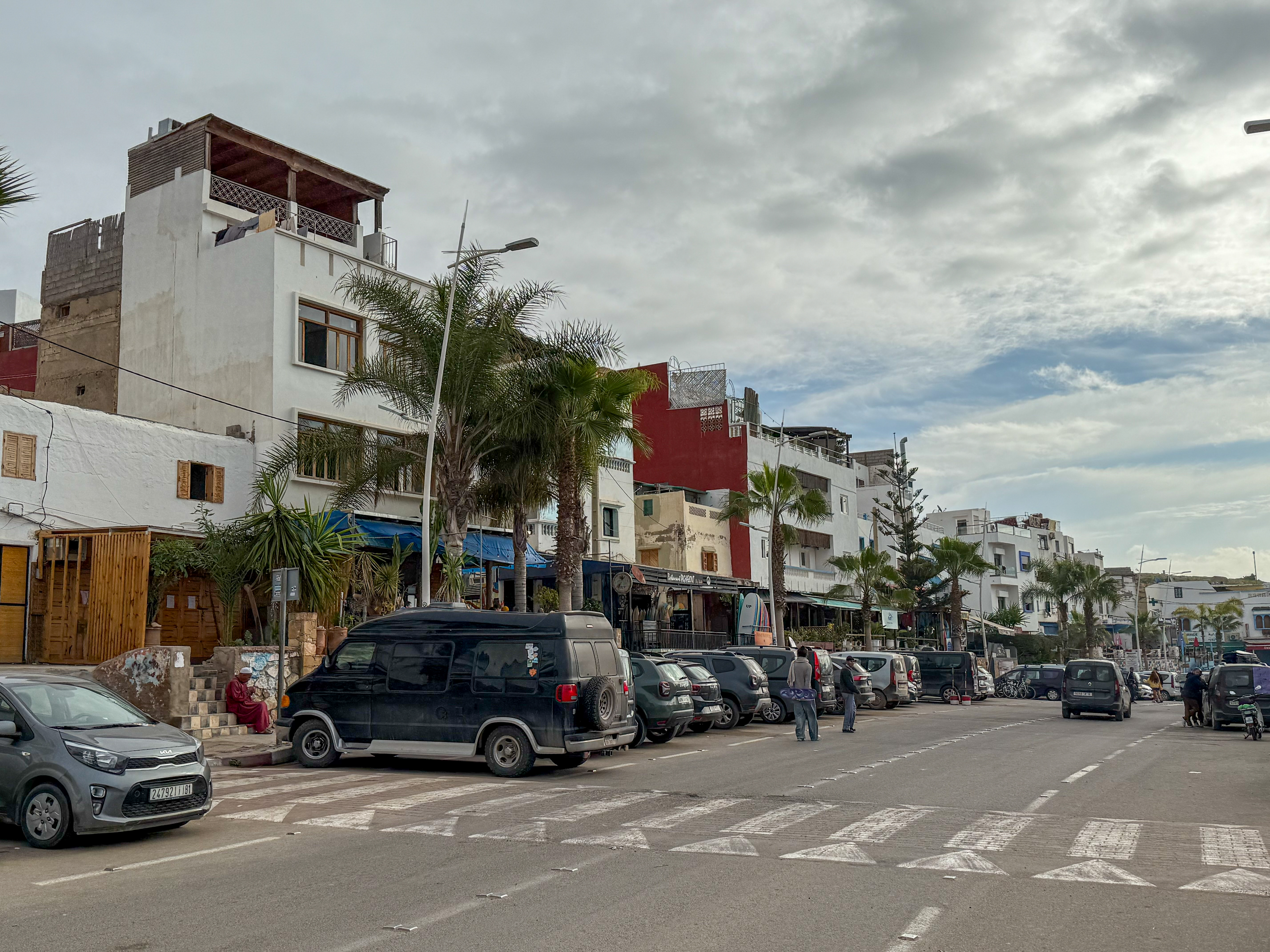
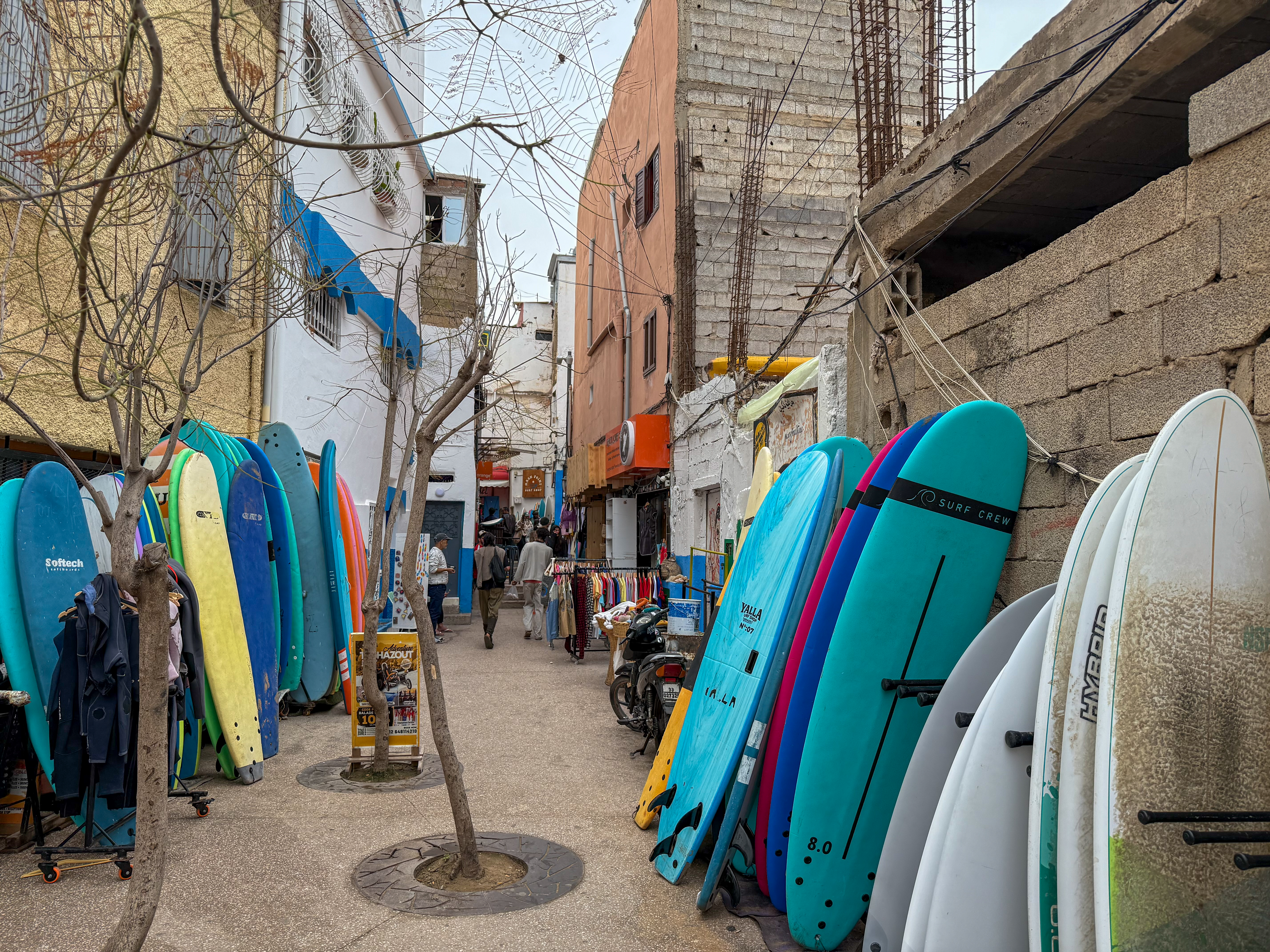
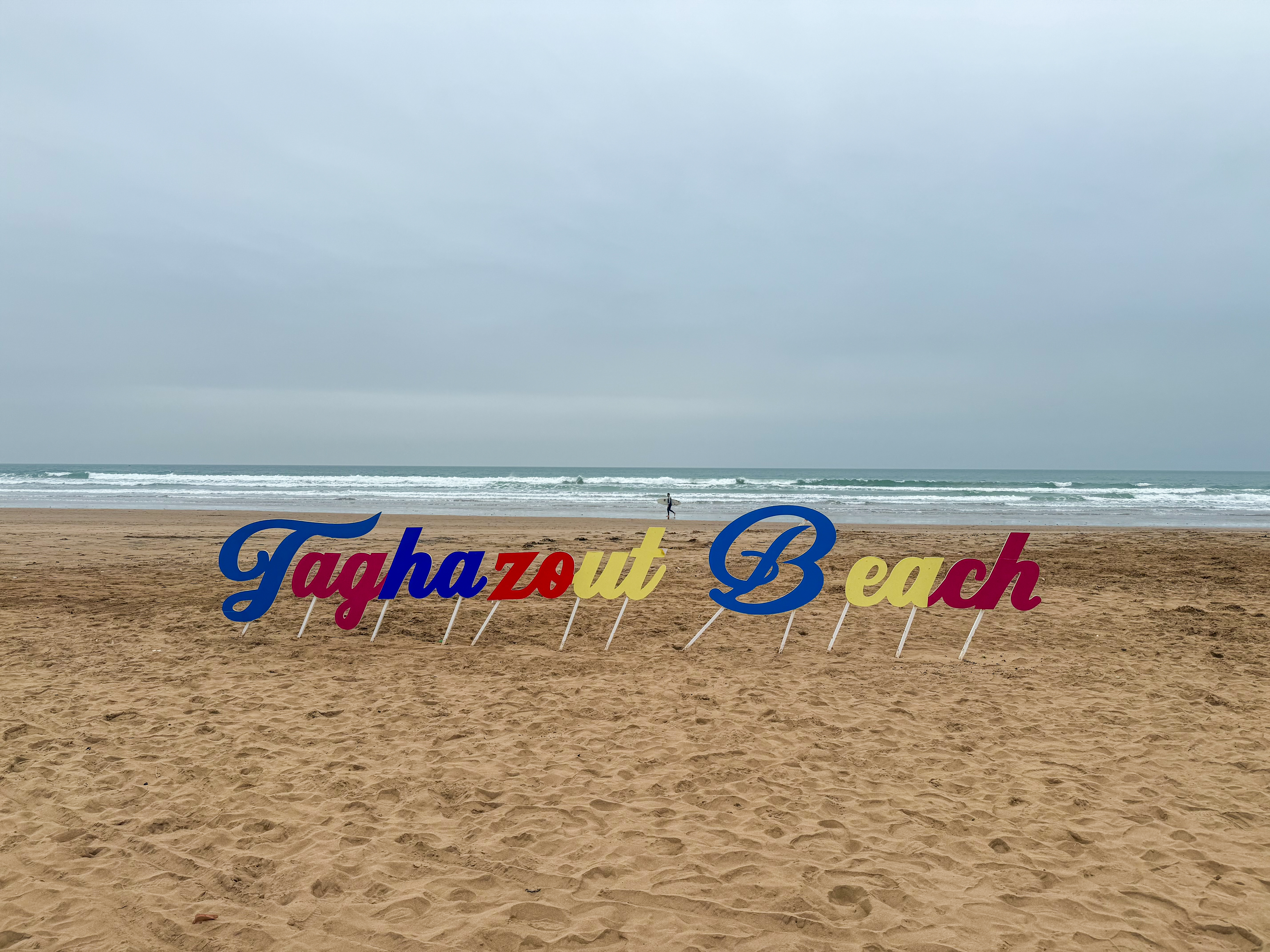
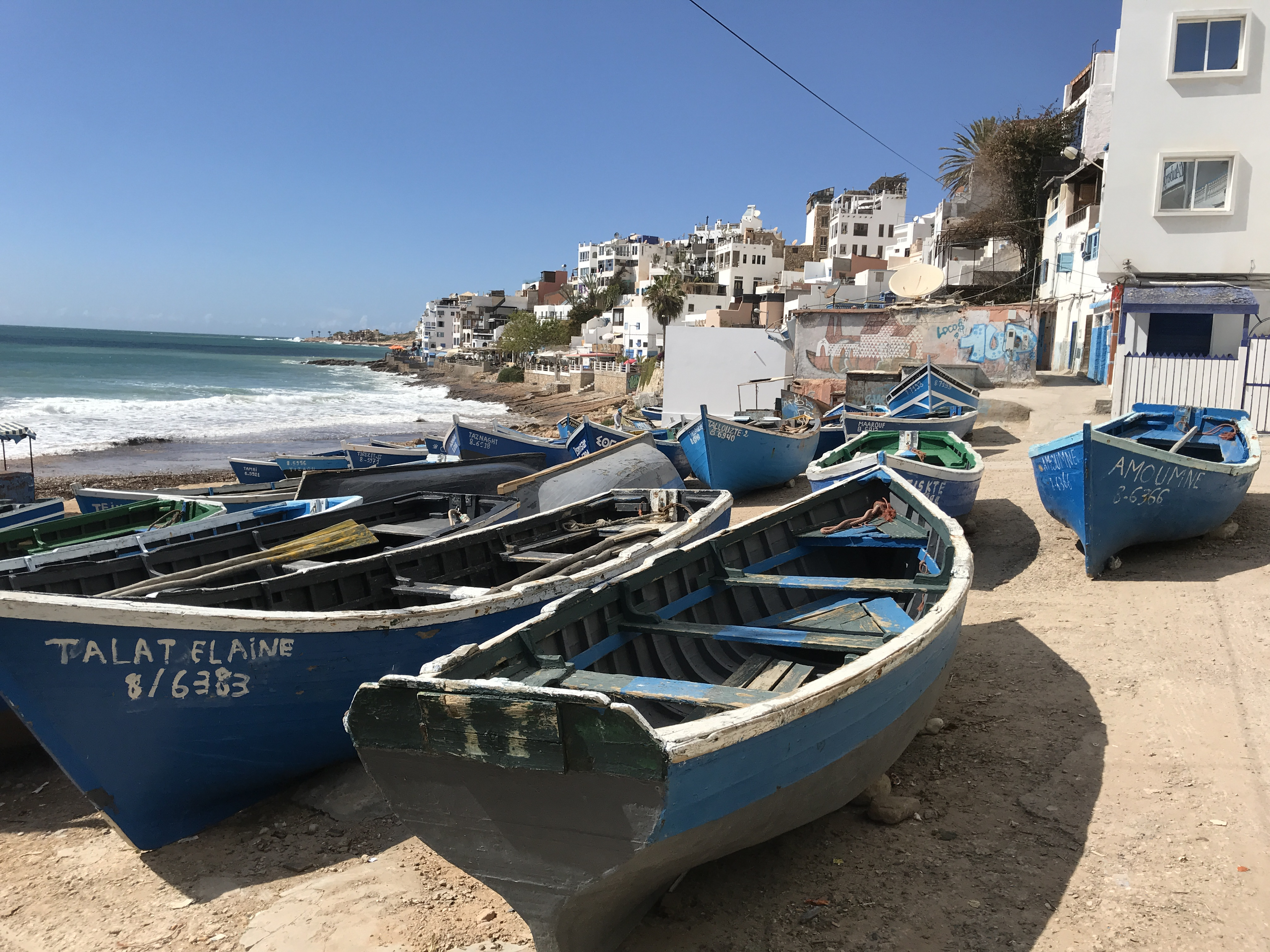
- Main Street Alley in Taghazout Taghazout Beach Fishing boats
- Interactive map of Taghazout
- Country: Morocco
- Region: Souss-Massa
- Prefecture: Agadir-Ida Ou Tanane

Government
  - President of commune: Mohamed Bouhrist (RNI)

Population (2014)
  - Total: 5,233.
- Time zone: UTC+0 (GMT)
- Area code: 80000

Taghazout (Standard Moroccan Tamazight: ⵜⴰⵖⴰⵣⵓⵜ, romanized: taɣazut; Arabic: تغازوت, romanized: taghāzūt) is a small Berber fishing village 19 km (12 mi) north of the city of Agadir in southwestern Morocco. The inhabitants are mostly of Berber origin. Fishing, tourism, and the production of Argan oil being the main source of income. In recent years, tourism has been increasing in importance to the local economy and it is a popular surfing destination.

== Geography ==
Taghazout is located on Morocco's Atlantic Ocean coastline, 19 km north of Agadir and 152 km south of Essaouira. Inland it is surrounded by the western foothills of the High Atlas.

== Demography ==
The inhabitants of earlier times were exclusively Berbers from the Ida Oufella tribe, but due to the increasing modernization (connection to the electricity, water and telephone networks) and the associated construction boom in the surroundings of Agadir, many newcomers from other regions of Morocco have joined.

Moroccan Arabic is the main spoken variety, but French, English, and Tachelhit are also spoken.

== History ==
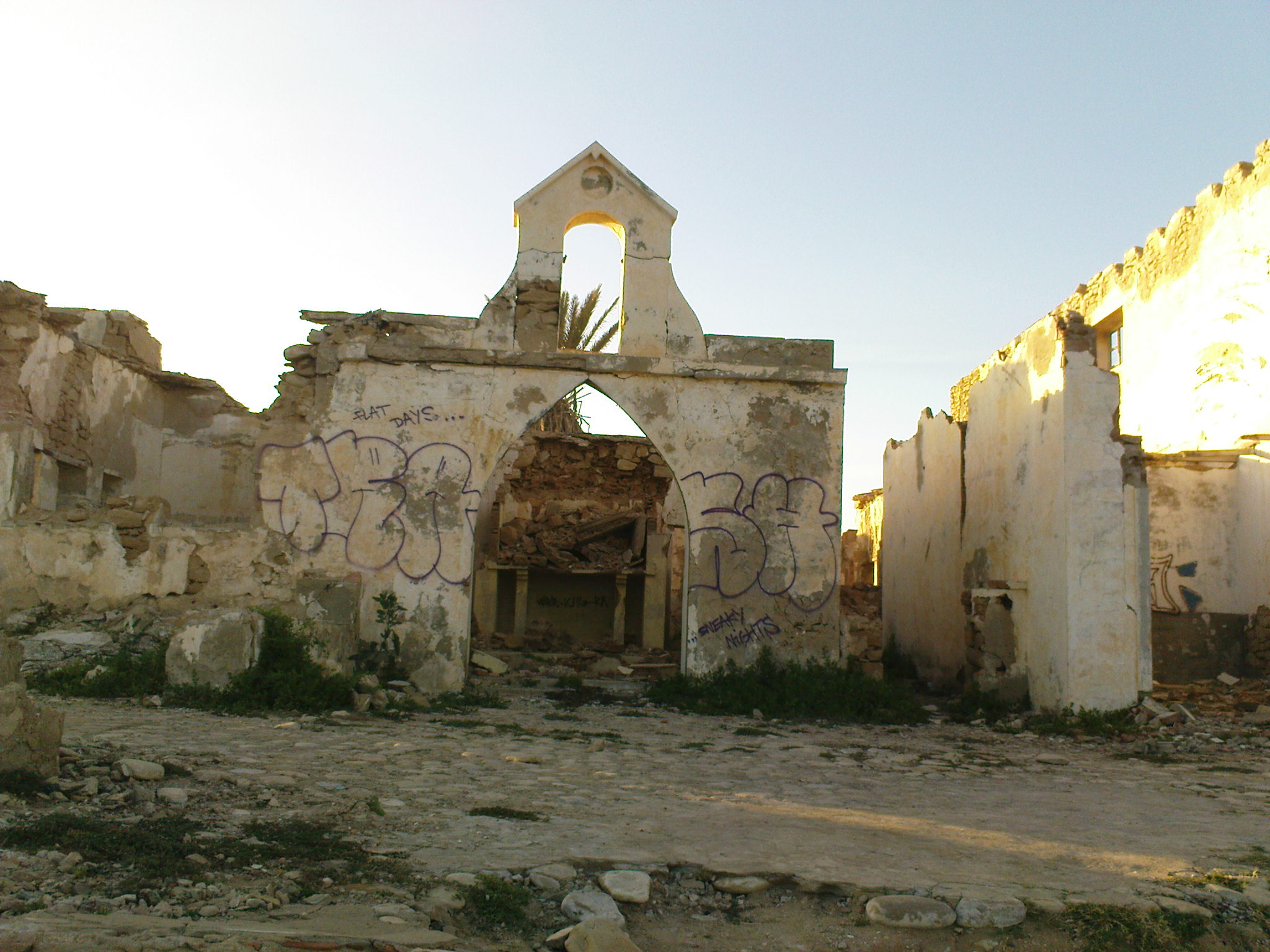
The ruins of buyirdn (la Madrague)

Like almost all Berber villages in southern Morocco, virtually nothing is known about the earlier history of Taghazout; oral traditions only report of clashes of the united Berber tribes with the Portuguese in the 16th century. The Berber inhabitants originally resided in the foothills of the surrounding mountains and used the village purely as a place to store their fishing equipment. As the Spanish increased their hold on the area in the 19th century, factories and mosques were built in order to house the Berber people and the village grew into a larger community.

In a similar fashion to Calangute Beach in Goa India and Kuta Beach on the island of Bali Indonesia, a beach just south of the village became famous in the late 1960s as a destination for young people to base themselves while exploring southern Morocco. On occasion, several hundred would reside in tents, makeshift buildings, and camper vans. However, the camp has been banned and instead replaced with fully equipped hotels and resorts for tourists.

Since 1992 Taghazout is the center of an independent municipality, which also includes several villages in the hinterland.

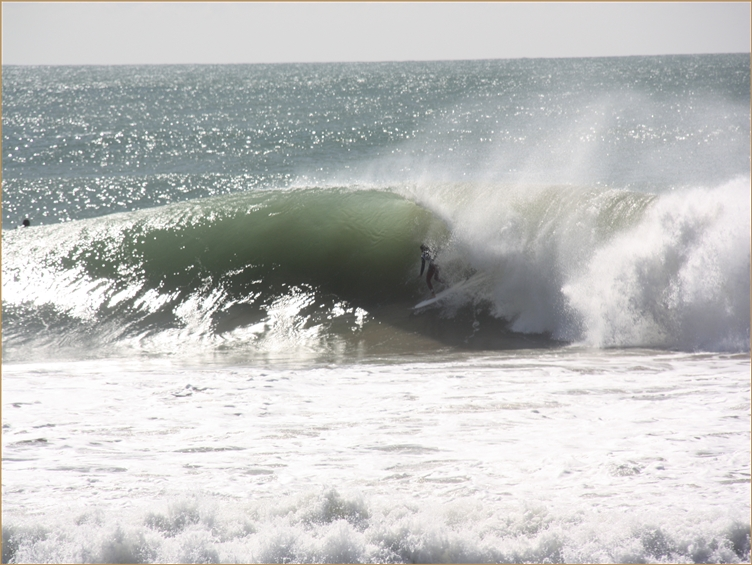
Anchor's - pumping

== Tourism ==
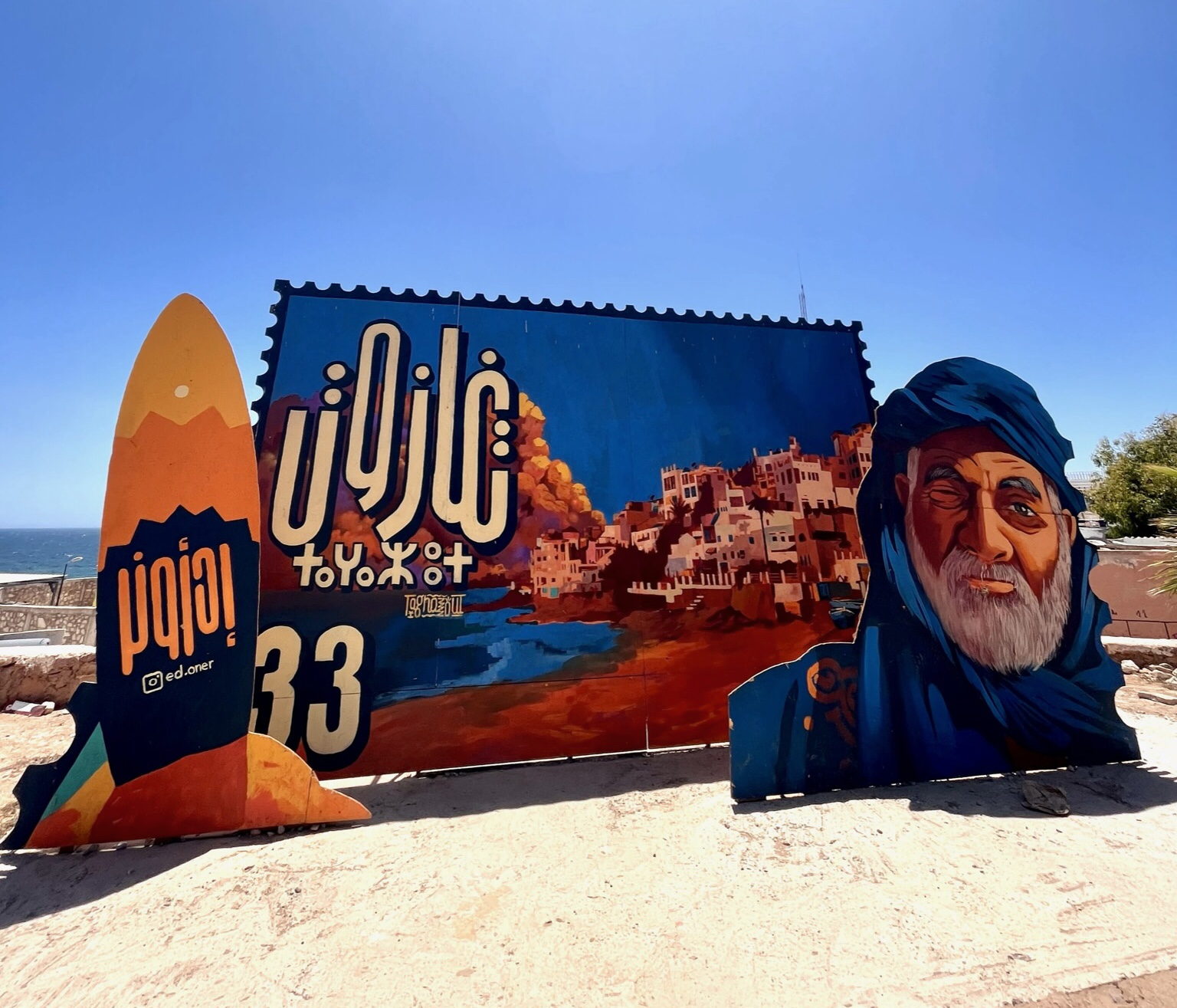
A graffiti art in Taghazout

Tourism is an important source of income of locals. Though, they are worrying about the urbanization projects in process (Taghazout Bay). The Moroccan Minister of Tourism underlined the importance of the ecological and sustainable component adopted as part of the project, for the benefit of the local populations of Taghazout and Tamraght, through the construction of public facilities and of income generating activities and jobs.

The project is supposed to attract 300,000 more tourists in the current period (from 2015 to 2020).

In addition to its beaches and surf spots, Taghazout also attracts visitors looking for calm and tranquility away from more visited destinations such as Marrakech and Agadir. Taghazout also serves as a convenient base to do other activities such as day trips to Paradise Valley trip, visiting Argan oil factories, camel riding on the beach, yoga retreats, paddle boarding and kayaking.

== Beaches ==
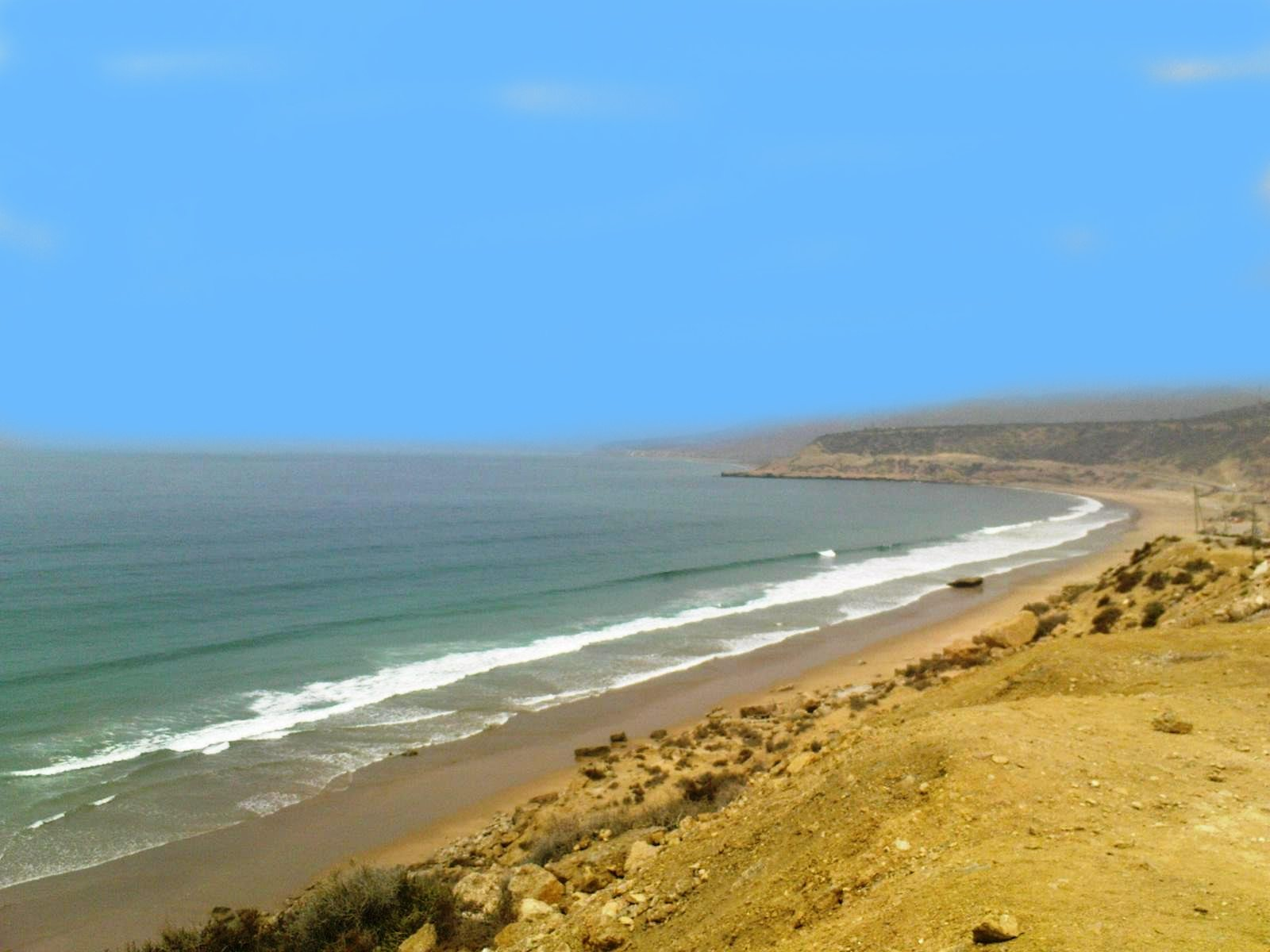
Abouda beach (27 km from Agadir)

There are several beaches north of Agadir, which all offer a good alternative to the local beach in town. The beaches have mountains on all sides, are wide, clean and have many necessary amenities. The largest and most popular ones are: Tamawanza (12 km), Aitswal Beach, Imouran (17 km), Taghazout beach (19 km), Du lkhmiss 20, Bouyirdn (21 km), Timzguida allal (22 km), Imiouadar (27 km), and Aghroud (30 km).

Surfing is now a common activity for visitors. Morocco is known for its long right-hand point breaks which are consistent and relatively uncrowded. The most famous of which, Anchor Point, is located 3 km to the north of the village. In the right conditions this point can take you on a 2 km ride, starting at Anchor Point, joining up with Hash Point and ending on the beach break at Panorama's. There are several other beaches in and around the area making it an ideal destination for all levels of surfing skill. The waves work best between September and April especially for advanced surfers, receiving similar conditions to that of mainland Europe, but with the warm waters of the Moroccan Atlantic up to 21 degrees.

== Taghazout Bay ==
The site Taghazout-Argana Bay is 15 kilometres north of Agadir. It is intended to become the first seaside resort in Morocco, 300 km from Marrakesh, the first cultural and tourist centre of the country and 180 kilometres from the city of Essaouira.

Taghazout Bay is part of the Moroccan national tourism strategy ‘Vision 2030’. It is expected (September 2018) to provide the implementation of 8000 beds (5800 hotels), with closer and more environmentally friendly tourism development, "Taghazout eco-resort." It further provides for a village of surfers, a village green holiday, camping with international standards, a 17-hole golf course, cafes, restaurants, shops and galleries.

== See also ==
- Plan Azur
- Surfing in Morocco
