= Surfing in Morocco =

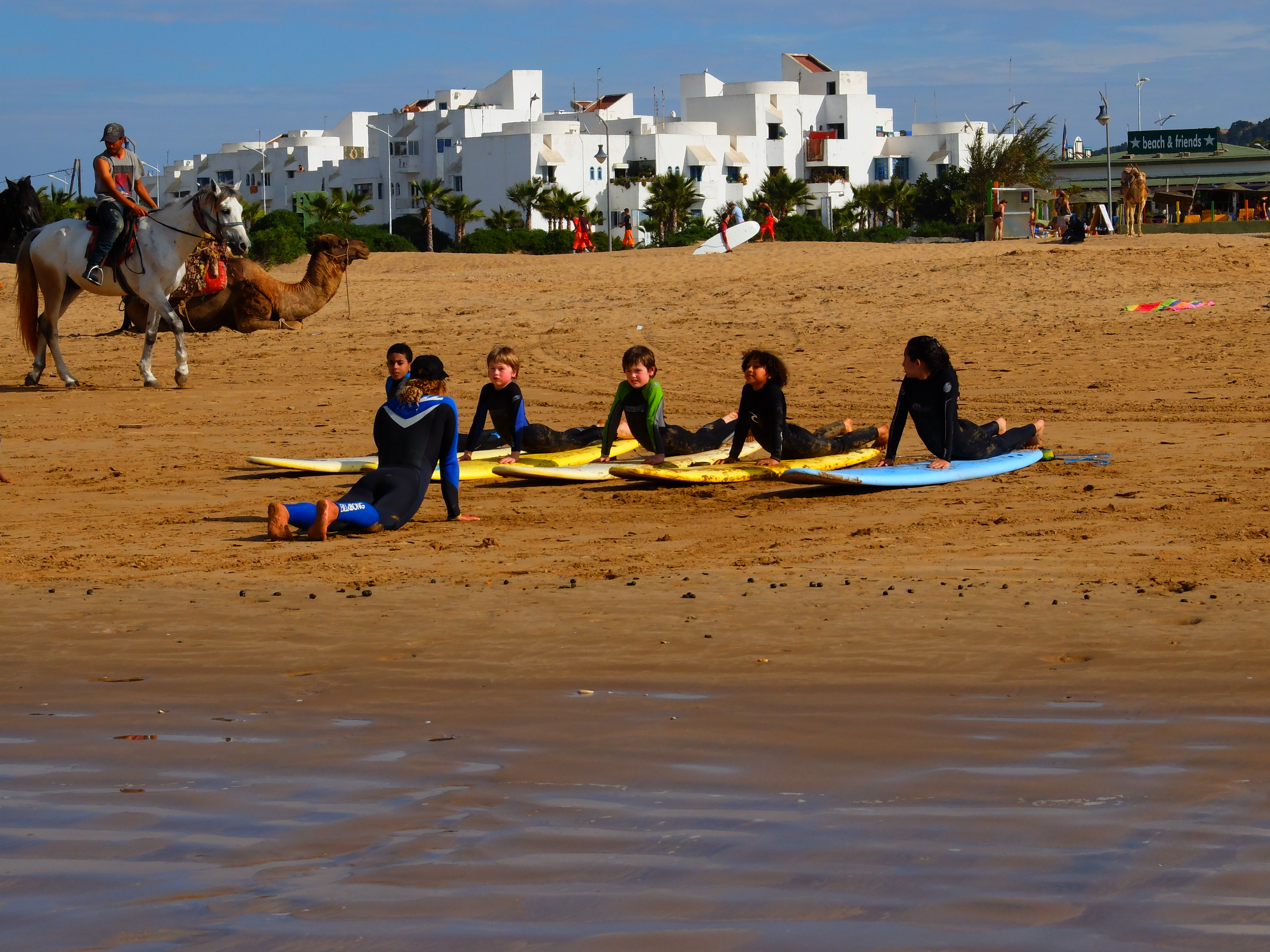
A surf lesson in Essaouira.

Surfing in Morocco forms a part of the country's tourism sector.

In the 1960s, European and American expatriates began surfing in Taghazout Bay. Historical records also suggest that American servicemen stationed at Kenitra (formerly Port Lyautey) introduced surfboards to Morocco as early as the early 1960s, particularly at Mehdia Beach near Kenitra. In the decades since, a surf industry has arisen in coastal areas of Morocco such as Agadir and Essaouira. The Moroccan government invested in seaside tourism infrastructure in Taghazhout Bay surf village as part of the 2001 Azur Plan, with the aim of creating 20,000 jobs for local people. Winter is generally the high season for surf tourism in Morocco. In Moroccan culture, surfing is generally considered a masculine sport, and women surfers challenge cultural norms in taking part.

== See also ==
- Imsouane
- Category:Moroccan surfers
