= Bay of Imsouane =

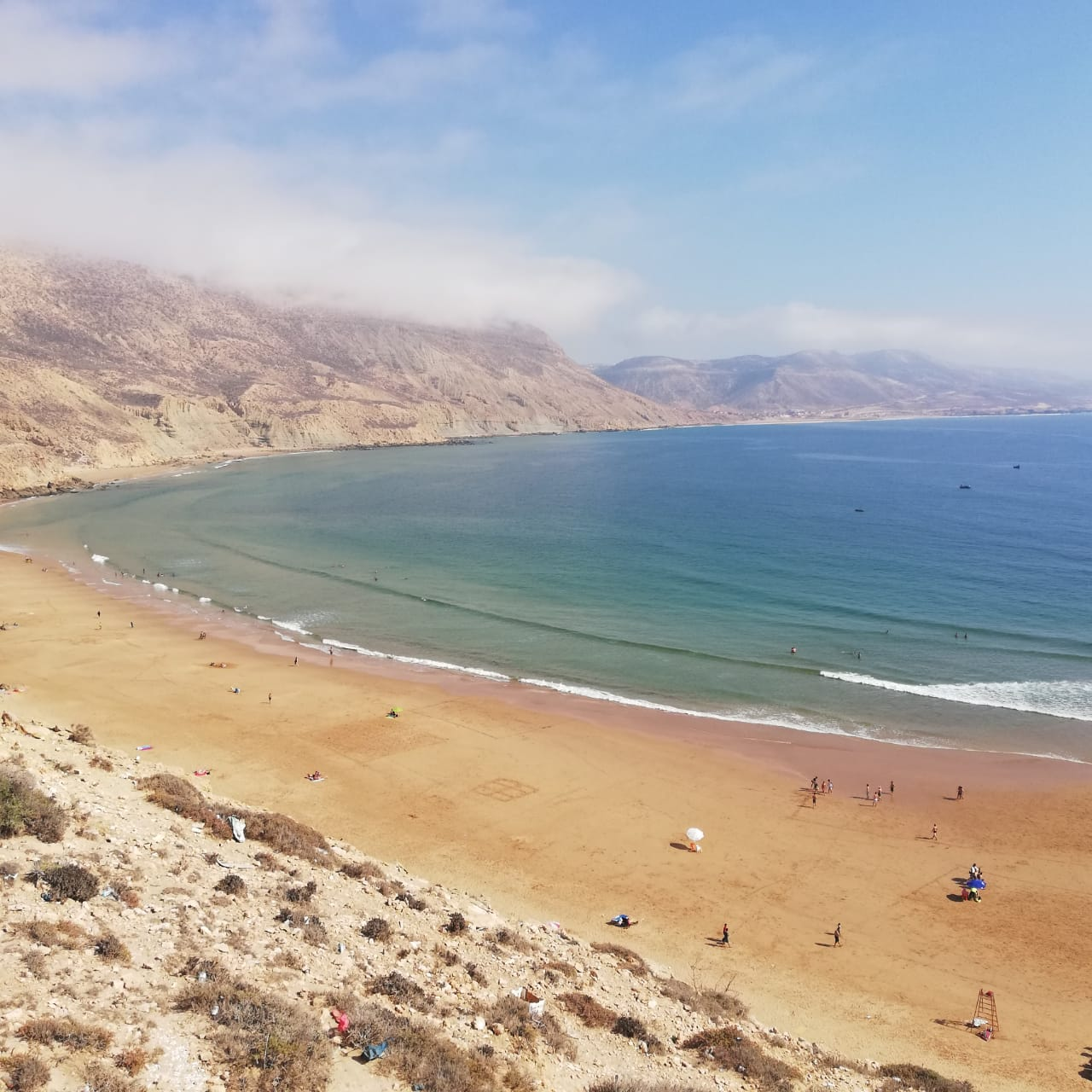
- Beach of the bay

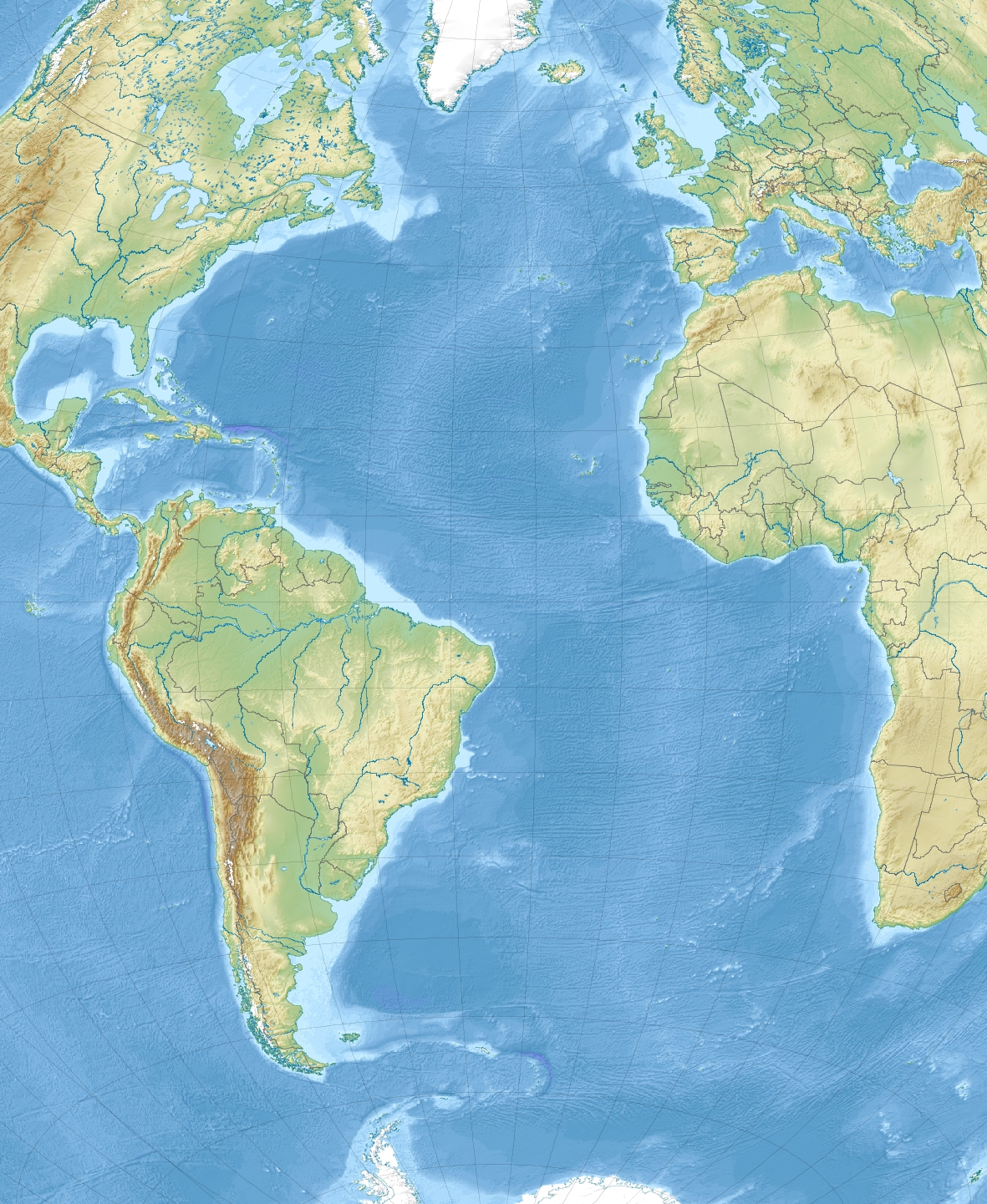
- Location within Morocco Location within Atlantic Ocean
- Location: Imsouane
- Coordinates: 30°50′N 9°49′W
- Type: Gulf
- Ocean/sea sources: Atlantic Ocean
- Basin countries: Morocco

The Bay of Imsouane (Arabic: خليج امسوان) is a gulf of the west coast of Morocco in Imsouane on the Atlantic Ocean.

The gulf is known to include the largest right point break in Morocco as well as a beach break spot, also called Cathedral Point. It also has a small port that is mostly used for traditional fishing.

== Gallery ==
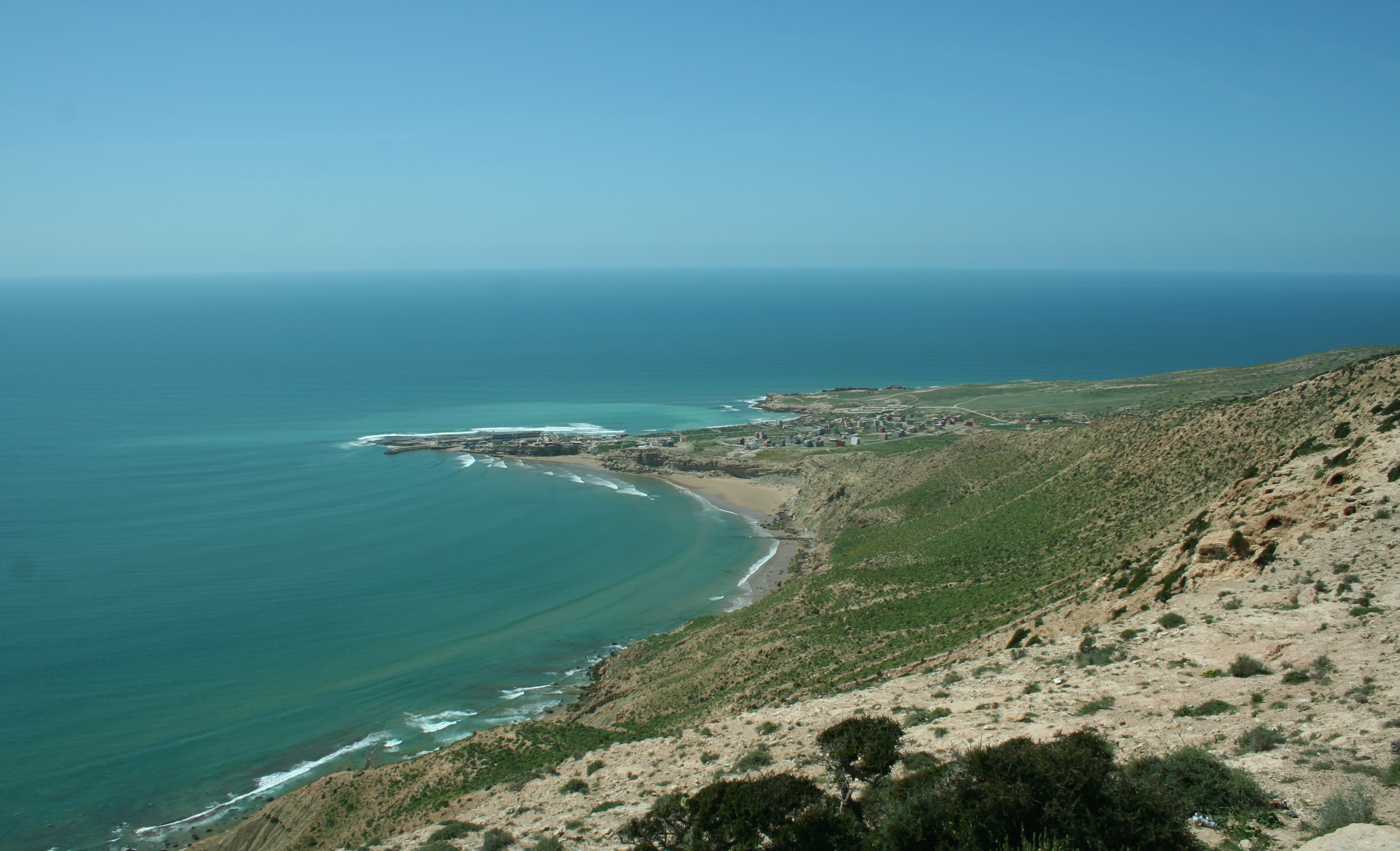
View over the bay area

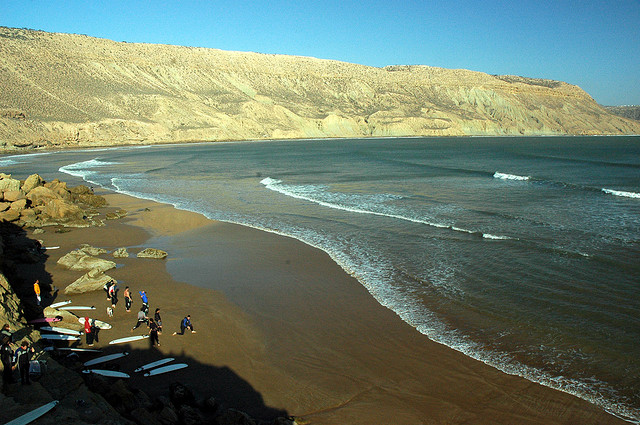
The beach

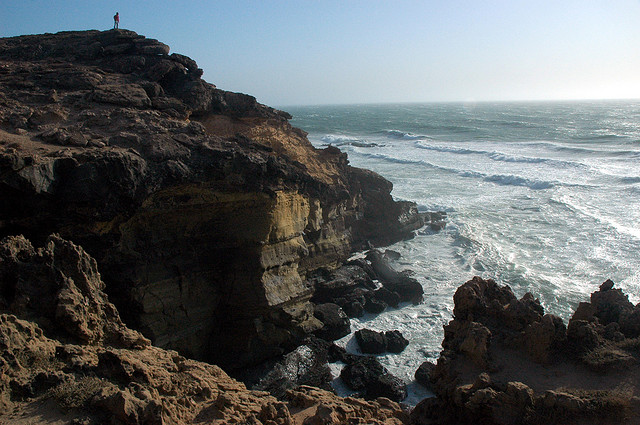
Rocks in the northern part of the bay

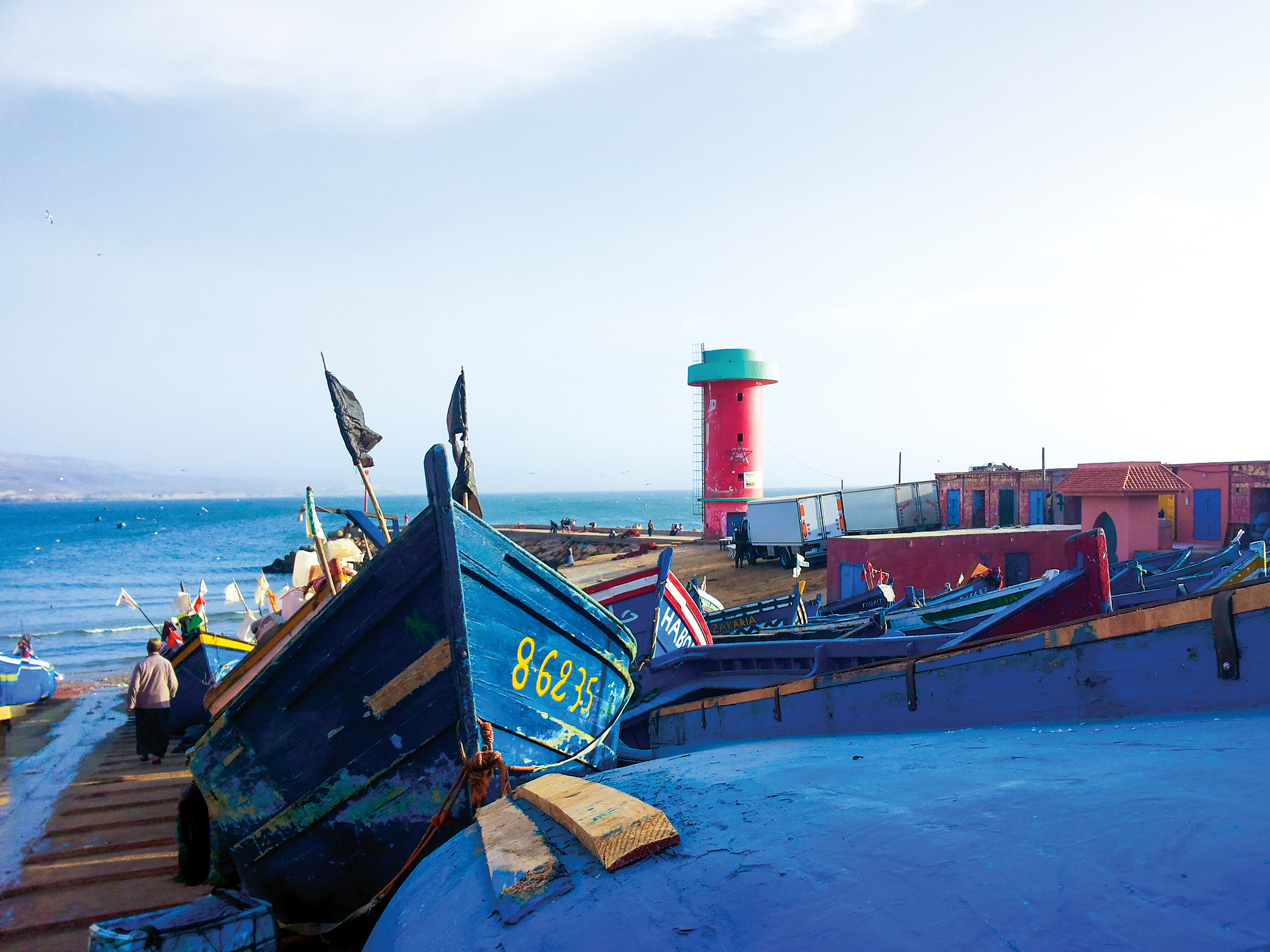
Traditional boats in the port

== See also ==
- Imsouane
