= Ameziane Museum =

Ameziane museum is a private museum opened in Nador, Morocco in May 2006.

The museum prompted controversy as it is dedicated to Maréchal Mohamed Ameziane, a former military chief of staff during the Third Rif War in early 20th century whom many believe helped the Spanish army in the Rif region of Spanish Morocco against the guerrilla revolutionary Abd el-Krim.

Berber people in Rif region have been awaiting instead for a museum dedicated to Abd el-Krim or at least bring the remains of him from Cairo, Egypt, where he died in asylum in 1963.
