= Imsouane =

Imsouane ⵉⵎⵙⵡⴰⵏ إمسوان
- Rural commune and town
- Imsouane
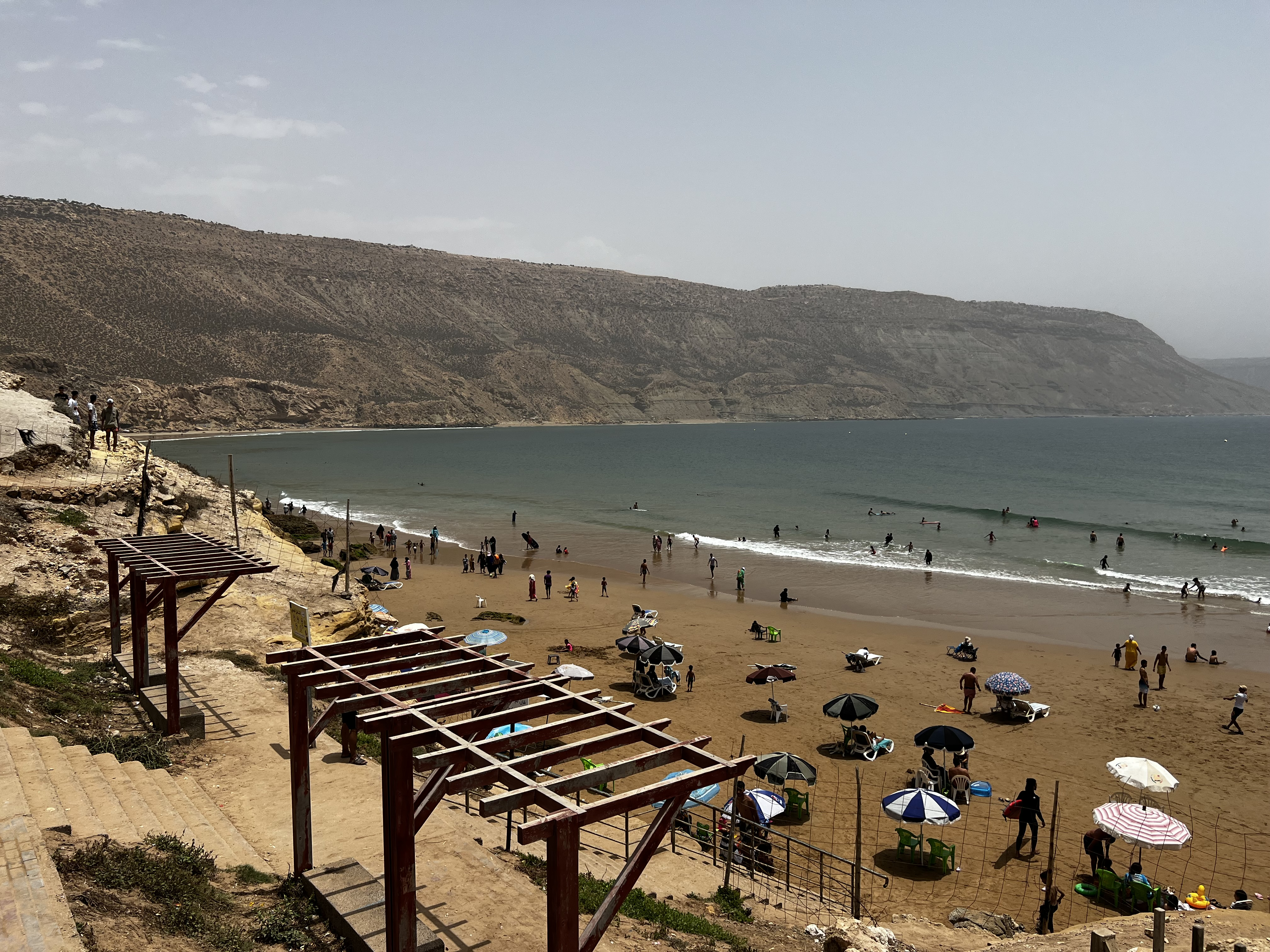
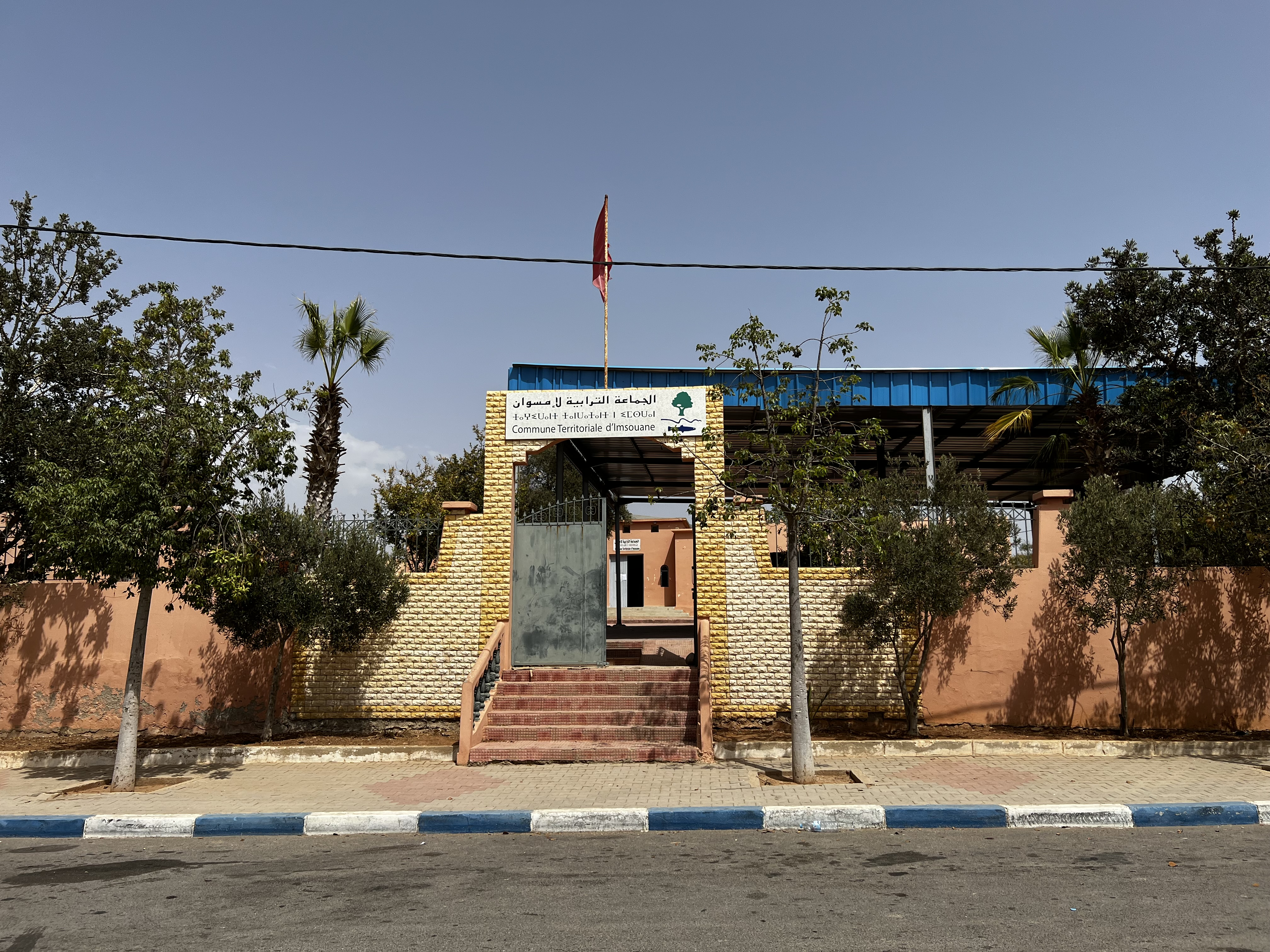
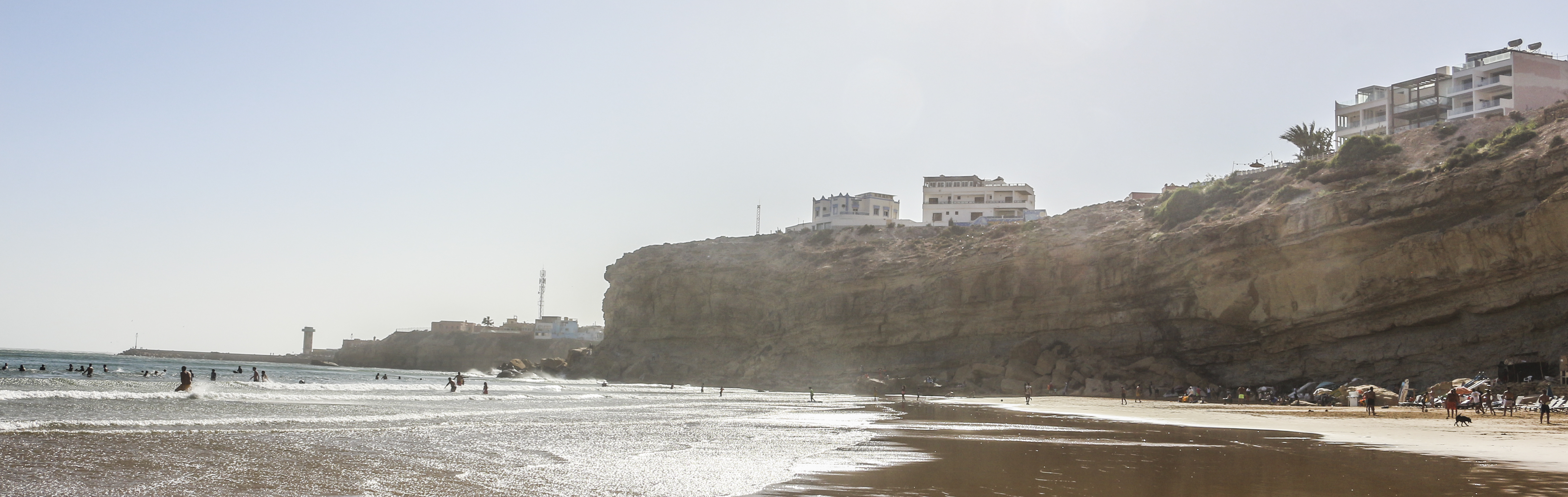
- Interactive map of Imsouane
- Coordinates: 30°50′36″N 09°49′07″W
- Country: Morocco
- Region: Souss-Massa
- Province: Agadir-Ida Ou Tanane

Population (2004)
  - Total: 9,353
- Time zone: UTC+0 (GMT)

Imsouane (Standard Moroccan Amazigh: ⵉⵎⵙⵡⴰⵏ; Arabic: إمسوان; Moroccan Darija: إيمسوان) is a small coastal town and rural commune in Agadir-Ida Ou Tanane Prefecture, Souss-Massa, Morocco. It lies on Morocco's Atlantic coast between Agadir and Essaouira. According to the 2004 Moroccan census, the commune had a population of 9,353 living in 1,704 households.

The town is internationally known for its surfing conditions and fishing port, making tourism and fishing among its principal economic activities.

== Geography ==
Imsouane is situated on the Atlantic coast of southwestern Morocco. The town occupies a sheltered bay bordered by cliffs and sandy beaches, creating favorable conditions for surfing throughout much of the year.

== Tourism ==
Tourism is one of the main economic activities in Imsouane. The town attracts both Moroccan and international visitors, particularly surfers, due to its long, consistent waves and relatively quiet atmosphere. In recent years, tourism infrastructure has expanded with the opening of guesthouses, surf camps, restaurants, and cafés.

== Surfing ==
Imsouane is regarded as one of Morocco's best surfing destinations and is known for two principal surf breaks:

- La Bay – a long point break suitable for beginners and longboard surfers and works best low to mid tide.
- La Cathédrale – a more exposed beach break particularly with a northwest swell, that generally offers faster and more powerful waves and is better suited to confident intermediate and advanced surfers.

The town forms part of Morocco's Atlantic surf coast, together with nearby destinations such as Taghazout and Tamraght.

== Economy ==
Fishing remains an important traditional activity. The local fishing port supplies fresh seafood to residents and visitors and supports the livelihoods of local fishermen.

Tourism has become an increasingly significant sector of the local economy alongside fishing.

== Transportation ==
Imsouane is connected by road to both Agadir and Essaouira. Private cars and taxis are the primary means of transportation, as public transport services are limited.

== See also ==
- Surfing in Morocco
- Taghazout
- Essaouira
