= Musée de Carmen-Macein =

- Carmina
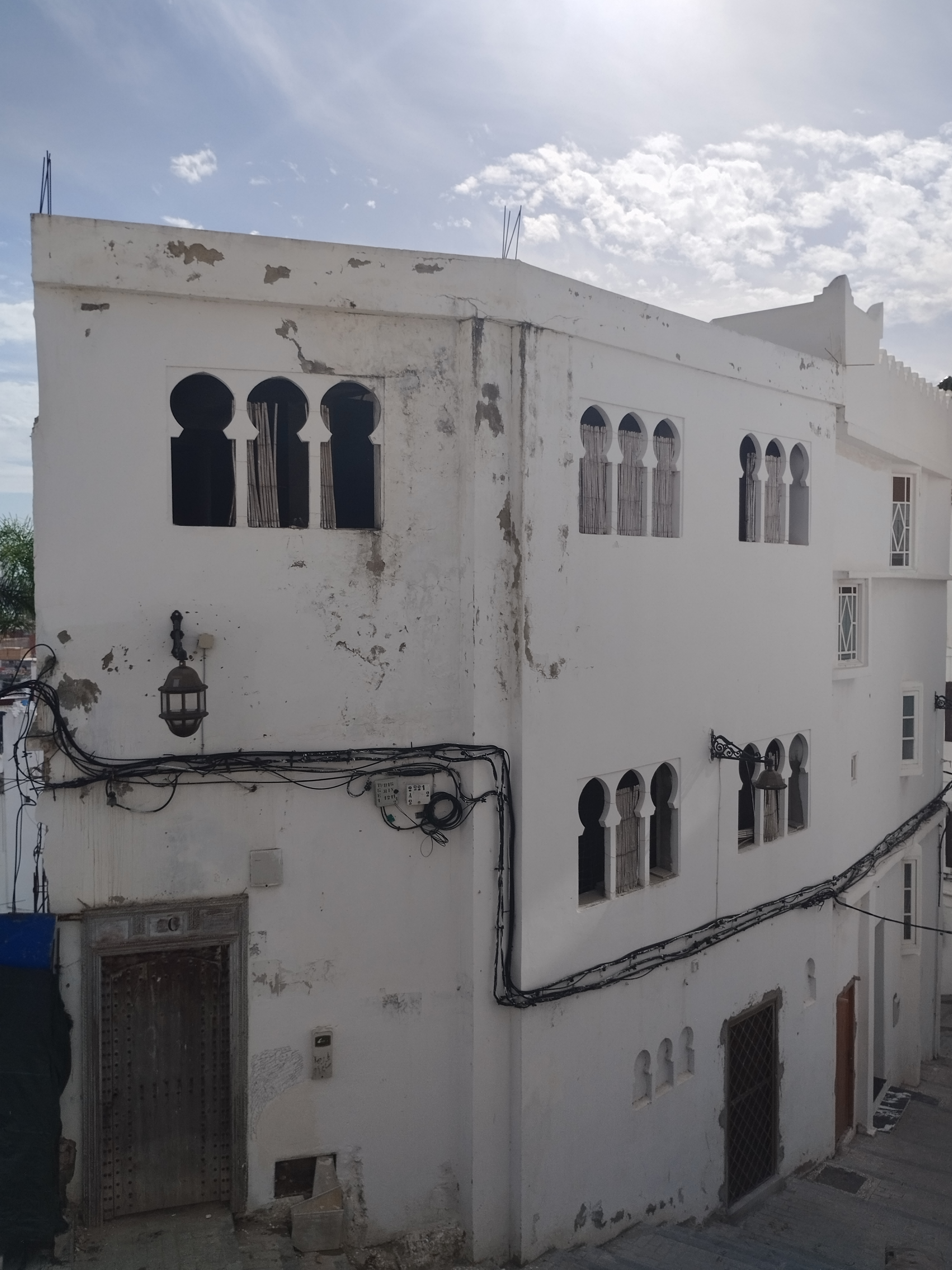
- Location: Tangier, Morocco
- Type: museum
- Collections: modern art

The Musée de Carmen-Macein (also called Carmina) was a private art museum in the Kasbah area of Tangier, Morocco. The museum contained sculptures, paintings and lithographs by artists such as Pablo Picasso, Max Ernst, Salvador Dalí and Georges Braque.

== Overview ==
Carmen Macein was a friend of the Spanish King Juan Carlos and a local figure of the beat generation gatherings in the Moroccan city. She was an art dealer who exhibited the artwork she sold on her yacht, the Vagrant. The boat was built by Horace Vanderbilt in 1941 and later bought by the Beatles in 1966.
