= Plan Azur =

Moroccan state investment project

The Plan Azur is an investment project initiated by the Moroccan government in 2001. The project aims at boosting tourism in Morocco through the development of six coastal resorts, five on the Atlantic coast and one on the Mediterranean coast. The project was launched in order to achieve the "Vision 2010" strategy which aimed to attract 10 million visitors a year to Morocco.

Plan Azur was developed to provide 80,000 beds and 10 golf courses. The project suffered several setbacks and delays, due to financial difficulties and to the lack of marketing.

== List of coastal resorts ==
=== Mediterrania-Saïdia ===
Mediterrania-Saïdia is the only Plan Azur resort on the Mediterranean coastline. The 7,000,000 sq m real estate project was launched in 2005 by a Spanish property developer Fadesa. The completion was planned for 2009, however, updates are documented on the official Mediterrania Saidia site.

==== Criticism ====
Mediterrania-Saïdia is close to one of Morocco's most biodiverse hotspots, the estuary of the Oued Melouia. Here, in dune forests are some of Moroccos's rarest species, and the construction companies involved at the site have come under criticism for poor environmental planning, leading to invasive impacts on these unique natural spaces.

=== Port Lixus ===
Port Lixus, a lower density resort than Mediterrania-Saïdia, is near Larache on the northern Atlantic coast, this Azur Plan resort will include two 18-hole golf courses, a new marina, a sports and leisure complex, several hotels and luxurious apartments and villas.

Salixus, a Belgian-Dutch consortium, is the master developer of this €1 billion, 4,620,000 sq m real estate project, earmarked for final completion in 2015.

=== Mazagan ===
South of Casablanca is Mazagan - Situated near El Jadida on the Atlantic coast. This Azur Plan resort was launched in late 2007 and will include a casino, two 18-hole golf courses, over 15 km of beach and several hotels and luxury properties.

=== Mogador Essaouira ===
Mogador Essaouira the fourth Plan Azur resort covering 5,700,000 sq m will include two 18-hole golf courses with more properties and hotels.

=== Taghazout ===
North of Agadir, the development will include several 4 and 5 star hotels, 2 golf courses, and several residential, leisure and retail facilities. Phase 1 properties are due for completion in late 2008.

=== Playa Blanca ===
The final of the six of the Plan Azur regions is Playa Blanca where development rights have been awarded to Fadesa, the main developer of the Mediterrania-Saïdia resort.

== See also ==
- Tourism in Morocco
- Economy of Morocco
