= Museum of Contemporary Art (Tangier) =

Art museum in Tangier, Morocco

The Galerie d'Art Contemporain Mohamed Drissi, formerly the Museum of Contemporary Art or Musée d' Art Contemporain, is a museum in Tangier, Morocco, housed in the building of the former British consulate near the Church of St. Andrew.

The museum opened in 1986. After a redevelopment in 2006 the museum was renamed and re-opened on April 12, 2007, under its current name. It shows mainly traveling exhibitions.
