= Runaway truck ramp =

Safety feature, used on steeply-graded down-hill roads

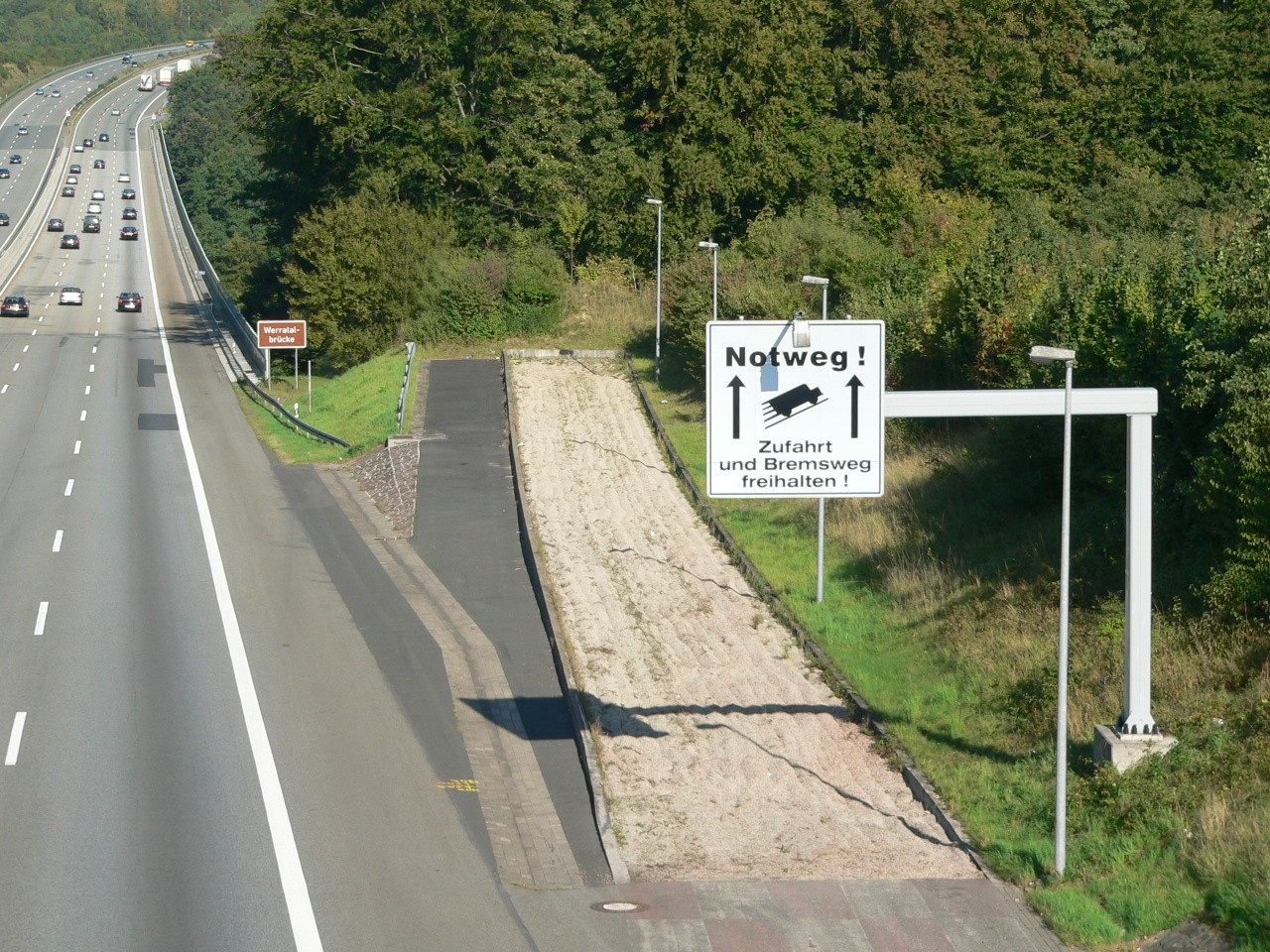
A runaway truck ramp on the A7 in Germany

Diagram

A runaway truck ramp, runaway truck lane, escape lane, safety ramp, emergency escape ramp, or truck arrester bed is a traffic device that enables vehicles which are having braking problems to stop safely. It is typically a long, sand- or gravel-filled lane connected to a steep downhill grade section of a main road, and is designed to accommodate large trucks or buses. It allows a moving vehicle's kinetic energy to be dissipated gradually in a controlled and relatively harmless way, helping the operator stop it safely.

== Design ==
Emergency escape ramps are usually located in mountainous areas which cause high construction costs and present difficult site selection. Designs include:

- Arrester bed: a gravel-filled ramp adjacent to the road that uses rolling resistance to stop the vehicle. The required length of the bed depends on the mass and speed of the vehicle, the grade of the arrester bed, and the rolling resistance provided by the gravel. These are similar to gravel or sand traps used on motor racing circuits in runoff areas on road courses and drag strips. The first negative grade (downhill) arrester bed in the United States was built and tested in 1977 along Interstate 5 near Siskiyou Summit in Oregon and approved for use while setting a standard for bed material in the US.
- Gravity escape ramp: a long, upwardly inclined path parallel to the road. Substantial length is required. Control can be difficult for the driver; problems include rollback after the vehicle stops.
- Sand pile escape ramp: a short length of loosely piled sand. Problems include sudden, forceful deceleration; sand being affected by weather conditions (moisture and freezing); and vehicles vaulting and/or overturning after contacting the sand pile.
- Mechanical-arrestor escape ramp: a proprietary system of stainless-steel nets transversely spanning a paved ramp to engage and retard a runaway vehicle. Ramps of this type are typically shorter than gravity ramps, and can work even on a downhill grade. These systems tend to be costly, but may save expensive real estate in crowded areas and prevent even more costly crashes. One such ramp at Avon, Connecticut in the United States has an electrically heated pavement surface to prevent snow and ice accumulation.
- Alternatives: such as a vehicle arresting barrier.

== Location ==
Emergency escape ramps are usually located on steep, sustained grades, as in mountainous areas. Long descending grades can allow high vehicle speeds to be reached, and truck brakes can overheat and fail through extensive use. The ramps are often built before a critical change in the radius of curvature of the road, or before a place that may require the vehicle to stop, such as before an intersection in a populated area. The placement criteria can vary from one region/country to another.

== Gallery ==
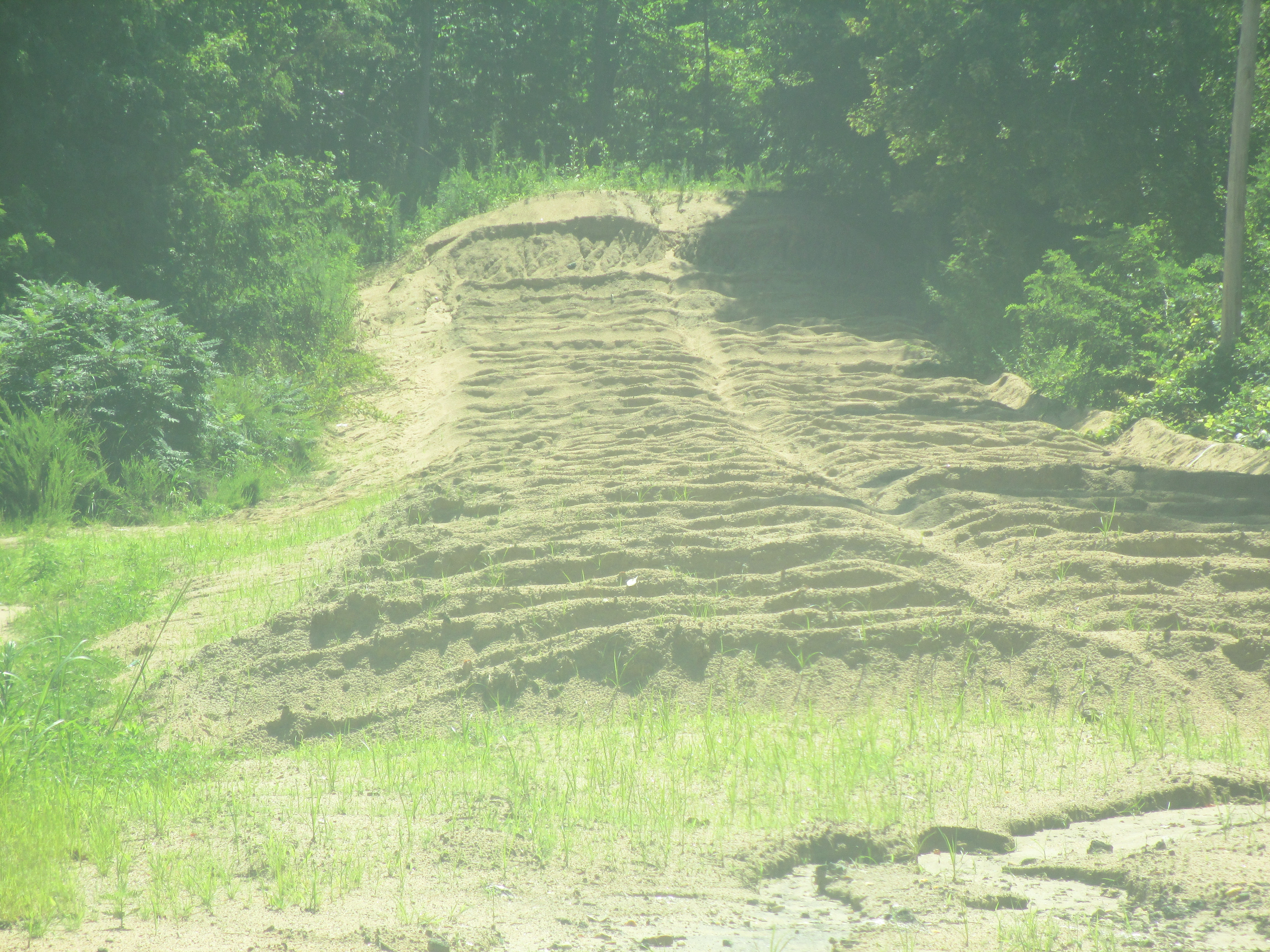
Runaway ramp on Interstate 40 east of Asheville, North Carolina

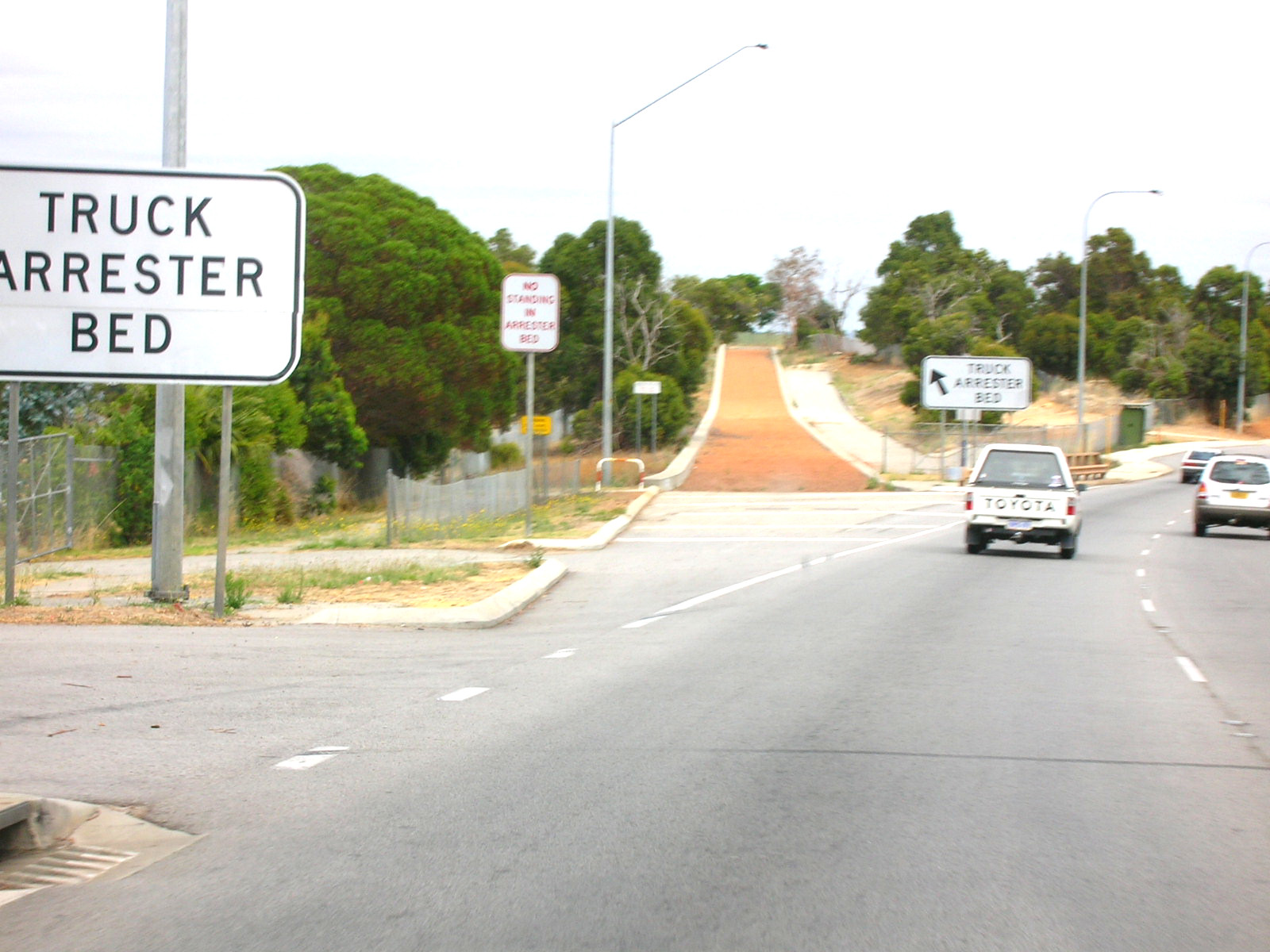
An arrester bed on Great Eastern Highway in Western Australia, located at the bottom of a hill before an intersection

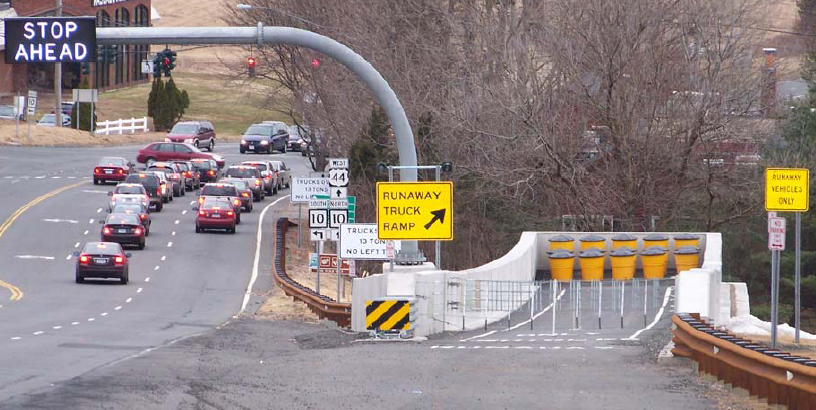
Mechanical-arrestor truck escape ramp (with heated pavement) on US 44 westbound in Avon, Connecticut

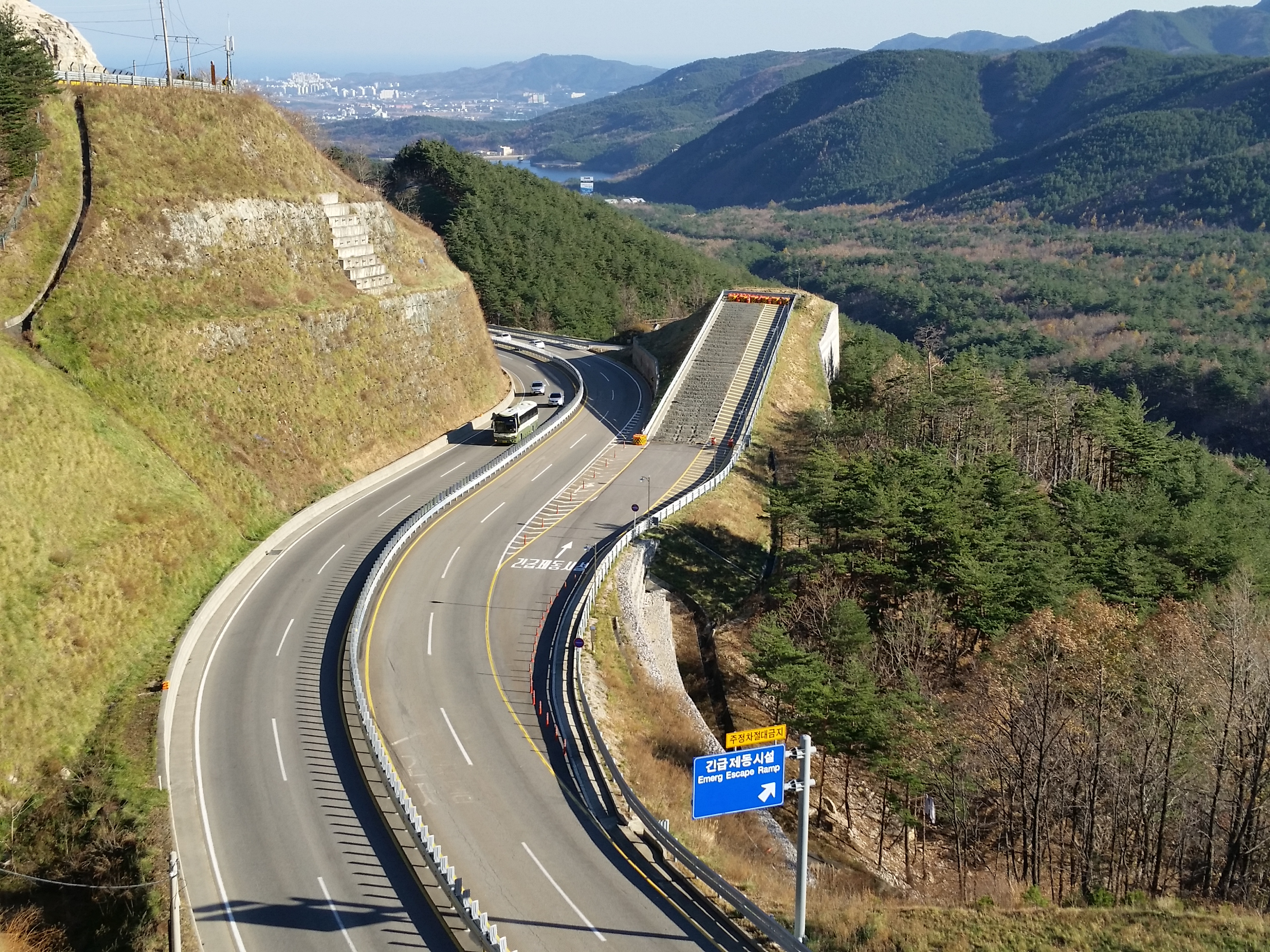
An emergency escape ramp on Misiryeong Penetrating Road in Gangwon Province, South Korea

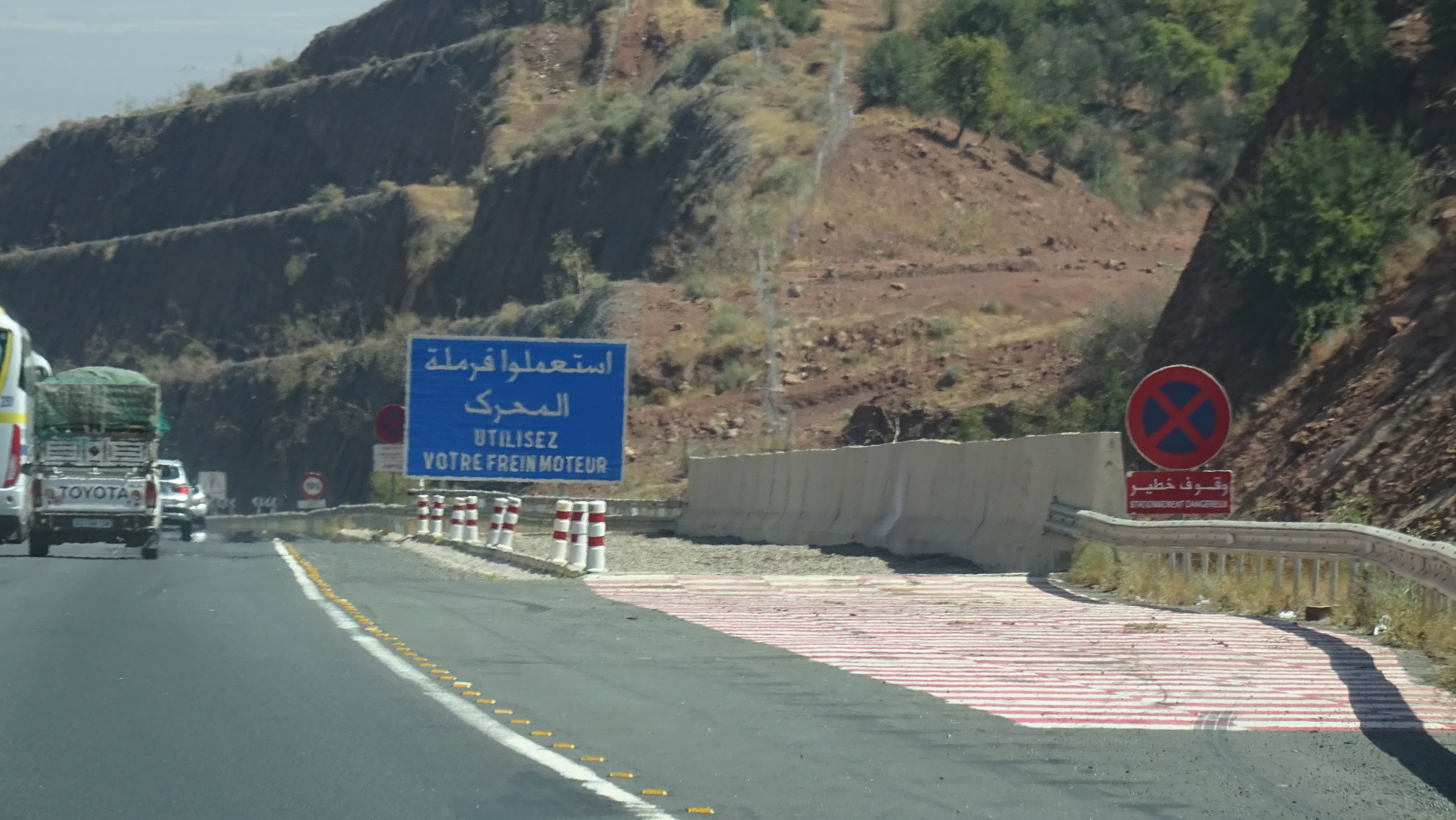
A 100 meter long gravel escape ramp downhill on the A7 near Amskroud in Morocco

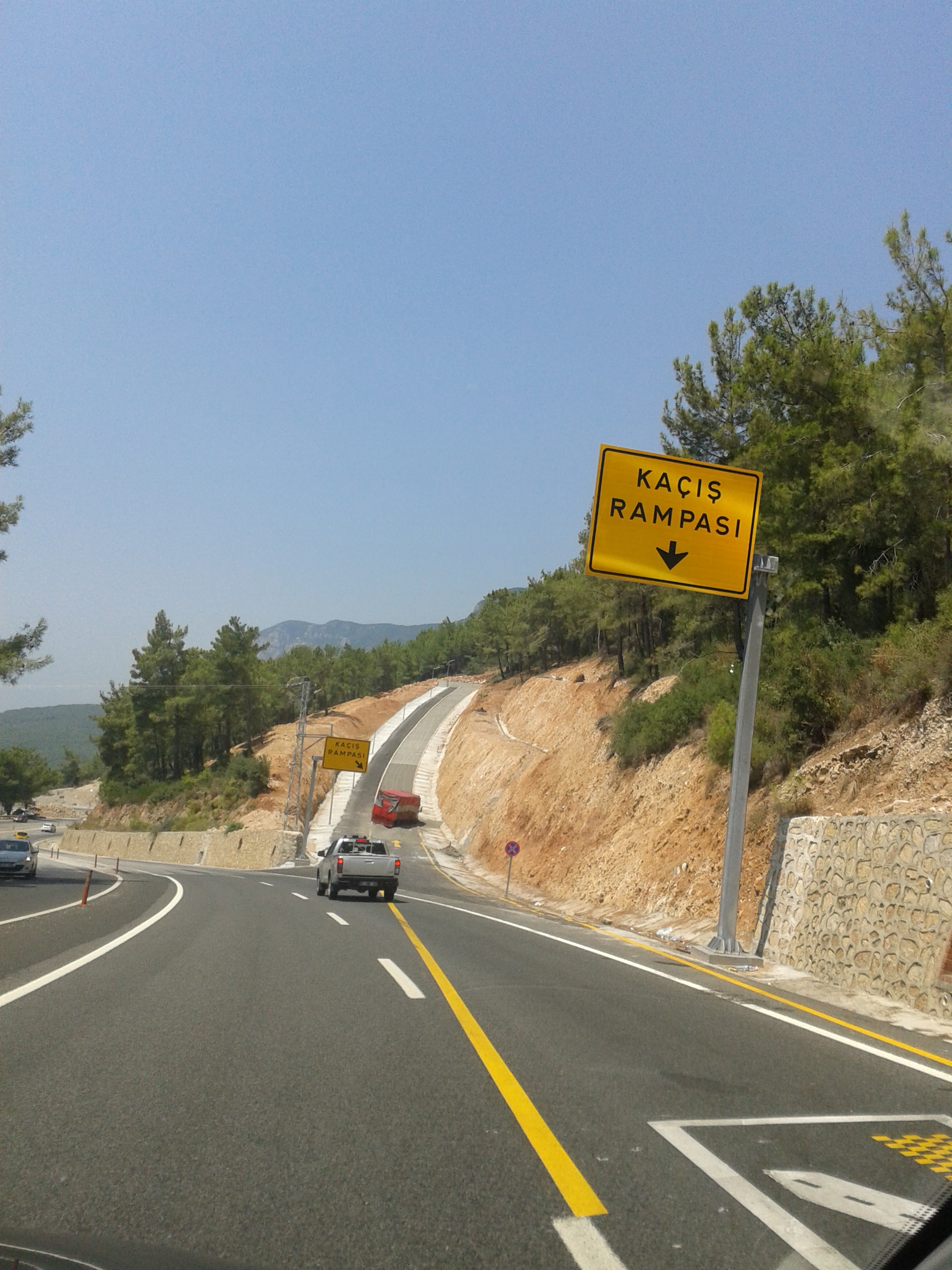
Emergency stopping lane in Muğla, Turkey

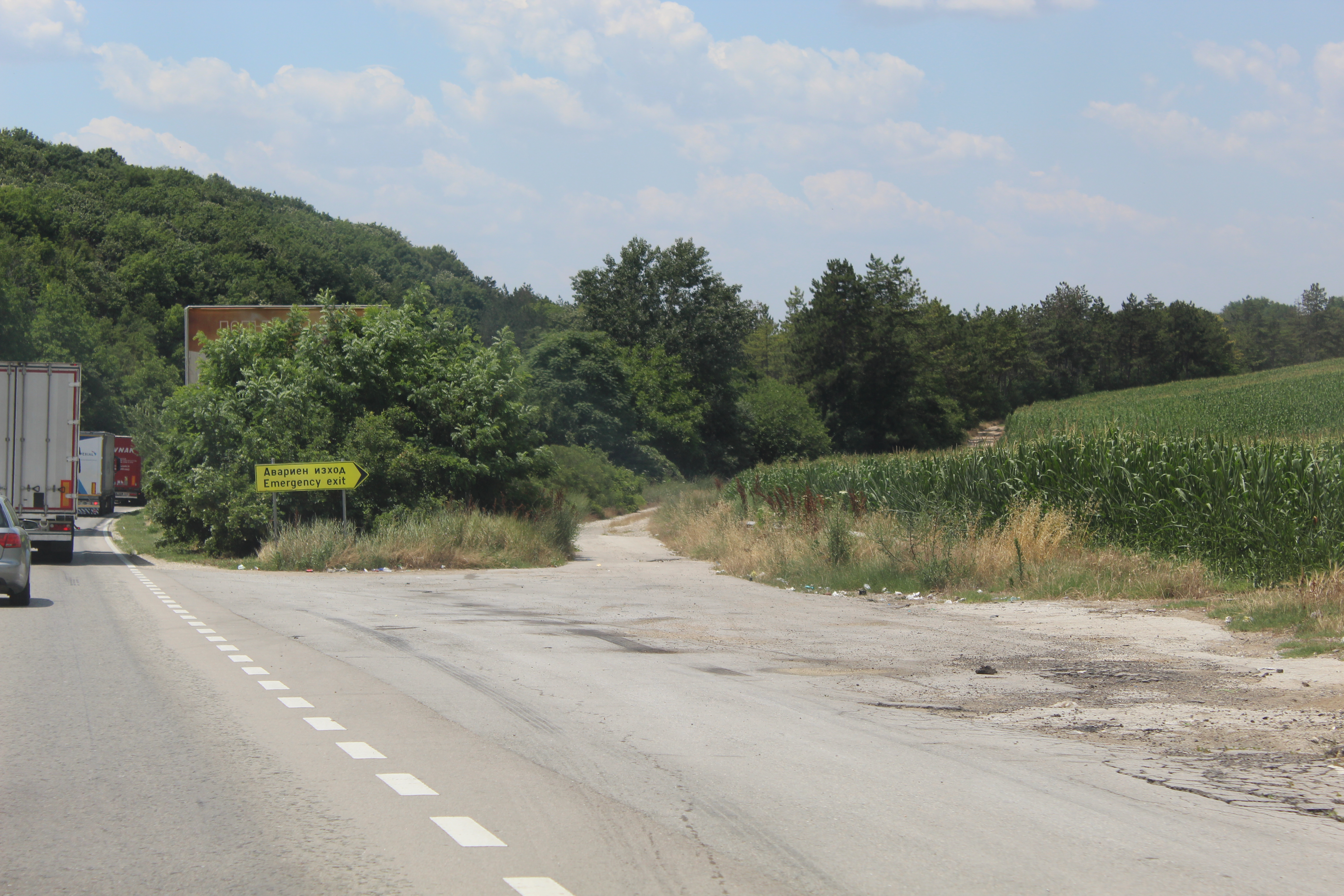
Improvised emergency exit for runaway vehicles on the I-5 near Byala, Bulgaria

== See also ==
- Catch points
- Derail
- Engineered materials arrestor system
- Runway safety area (RSA/RESA) for airplanes
