= Imouzzer =

There is more than one place called Imouzzer:

- Imouzzer Ida Ou Tanane in Agadir-Ida Ou Tanane Prefecture, Souss-Massa-Drâa, Morocco
- Imouzzer Kandar in Sefrou Province, Fès-Boulemane, Morocco
- Imouzzer Marmoucha in Boulemane Province, Fès-Boulemane, Morocco
