= Pine Grove School House =

Historic schoolhouse in Connecticut, United States

Pine Grove School
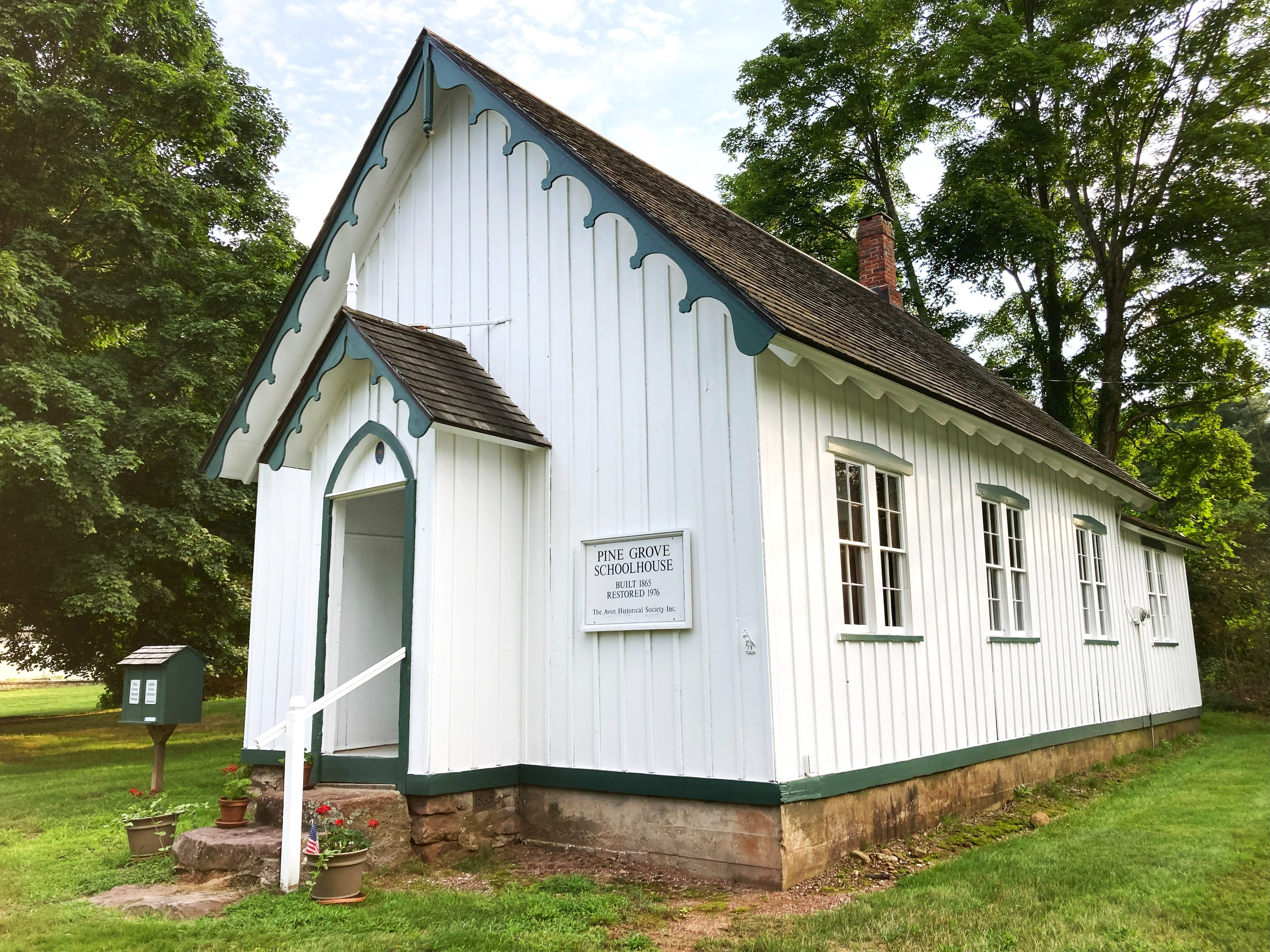
- Avon, Connecticut; United States

Information
- Established: 1865
- Closed: 1949
- Grades: 1-8 (originally); 1-6 (later)

The Pine Grove School House is a one room schoolhouse in the town of Avon, Connecticut, in the United States. It was built in 1865 and was originally named Schoolhouse No. 7 as it was the school in the 7th town district at the time. In the 1920s, a teacher renamed the school Pine Grove School after noting a grove of pine trees at the top of the hill on West Avon Road.

The school was open until 1949, when it was the last one-room schoolhouse in town to close. The classes ran from grades 1-8 originally and then were reduced to students in grades 1-6. The school served children from Avon, Farmington, and Collinsville. Children went to the nearest school regardless of the town they lived in.

The school was originally lit by kerosene lamps and was heated until it closed by a wood stove in the center of the room. Older children were responsible for bringing wood & coal to heat the school. Older students were also responsible for keeping the stove going.

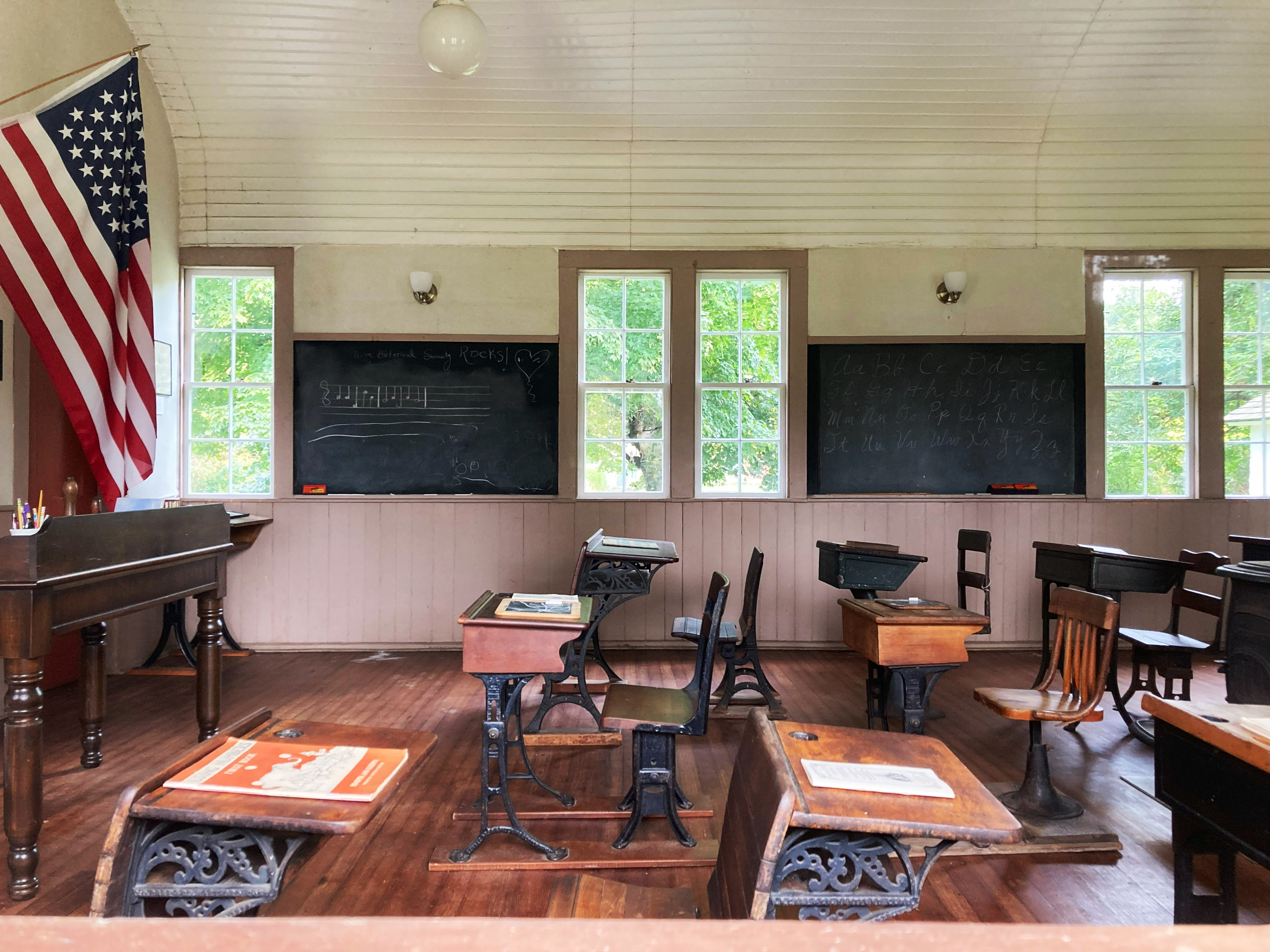

There is no plumbing at the school. The students were served by an outside pump and an outhouse.

After the town closed the school in 1949, it was used as a branch library, nursery school, and home for the Boy Scouts.

The Avon Historical Society restored the building, and it was opened to the public in 1976. It is currently open to visitors on Sundays from 2pm to 4pm, June through September or by appointment with the Avon Historical Society. The school is part of the Pine Grove Historic District, which was added to the National Register of Historic Places in 1980.

One of Avon's two elementary schools, Pine Grove Elementary School, now bears the same name in honor of the original Pine Grove School.
