= FAF =

FAF may refer to:

== People ==
- Faf de Klerk (born 1991), South African rugby union footballer
- Faf du Plessis (born 1984), South African cricketer
- Faf Larage (born 1971), French rapper
- Frederick A. Fillmore (1856–1925), American composer and music publisher

== Sport ==
- Algerian Football Federation (French: Fédération algérienne de football)
- Andalusia Football Federation (Spanish: Federación Andaluza de Fútbol)
- Andorran Football Federation (Catalan: Federació Andorrana de Futbol)
- Angolan Football Federation (Portuguese: Federação Angolana de Futebol)
- Aragon Football Federation (Spanish: Federación Aragonesa de Fútbol)
- Federación Argentina de Football, the Argentine Football Federation, active 1912–1914

== Other uses ==
- Citroën FAF, an automobile
- Fagani language, spoken in the Solomon Islands
- Familial Amyloidosis, Finnish Type, a heritable cutaneous condition
- Fat and Frantic, a British pop group
- Felker Army Airfield, FAA and IATA airfield codes
- Fermata Arts Foundation, an American cultural organization
- Financial Accounting Foundation, an American regulator
- Final approach fix in aviation
- Finnish Air Force
- Fire-and-forget
- First American Financial Corporation, an American financial services company
- French Air and Space Force
- Front Algérie Française, an extremist group in former French Algeria
- Folded arm figurines, an idiosyncratic type of sculpture in Cycladic art
- Fundus autofluorescence, an imaging technique for studying the retina
