= Tadrart =

Tadrart means "mountain" (feminine form) in Berber, and may refer to:

- Tadrart, a village in the Souss-Massa-Drâa region of Morocco
- Tadrart Acacus, a mountain chain in Libya designated a UNESCO World Heritage Site in 1985 for its ancient petroglyphs
- Tadrart Rouge, the southern prolongation of the Tadrart Range in Algeria
