= Pine Grove Historic District =

Pine Grove Historic District may refer to:

- Pine Grove Historic District (Avon, Connecticut), listed on the National Register of Historic Places in Hartford County, Connecticut
- Pine Grove Historic District (Pine Grove, Pennsylvania), listed on the National Register of Historic Places in Schuylkill County, Pennsylvania
