= Horse Guard State Park =

State park in Hartford County, Connecticut

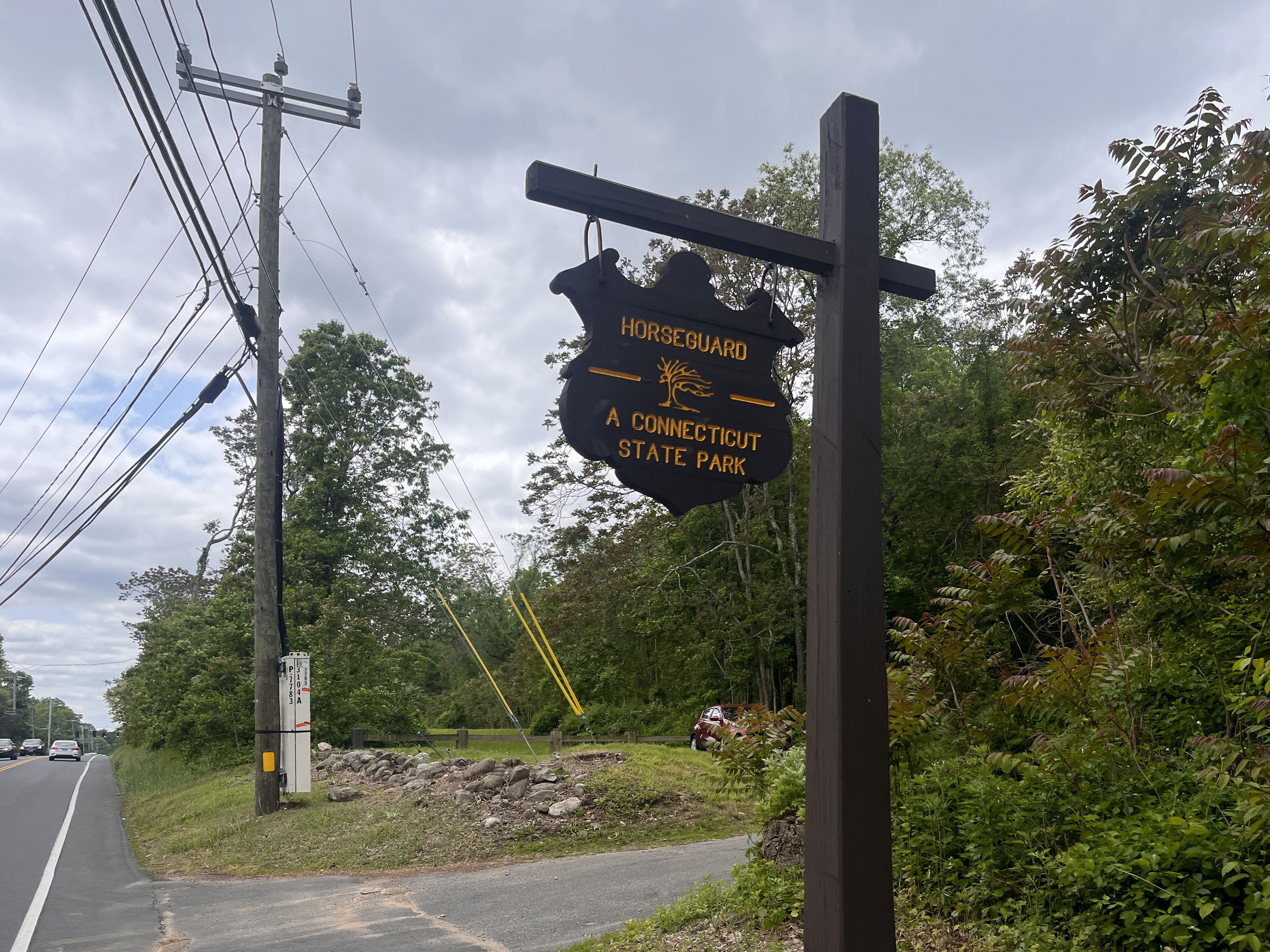
- Sign by the entrance to the park

- Location within Connecticut Location within the United States
- Location: Avon, Connecticut, United States
- Coordinates: 41°47′58″N 72°51′53″W
- Area: 105 acres (42 ha)
- Elevation: 580 ft (180 m)
- Established: 1964
- Administrator: Connecticut Department of Energy and Environmental Protection
- Designation: Connecticut state park
- Website: Official website

Horse Guard State Park is a public recreation area covering 105 acres (42 ha) in the town of Avon, Connecticut. The state park is managed by the Connecticut Department of Energy and Environmental Protection.

== History ==
The park has seen little development since the land's purchase by the state in 1964. It was named for the First Company Governor's Horse Guards, founded in 1788 and the oldest active mounted cavalry unit in the U.S.

== Activities and amenities ==
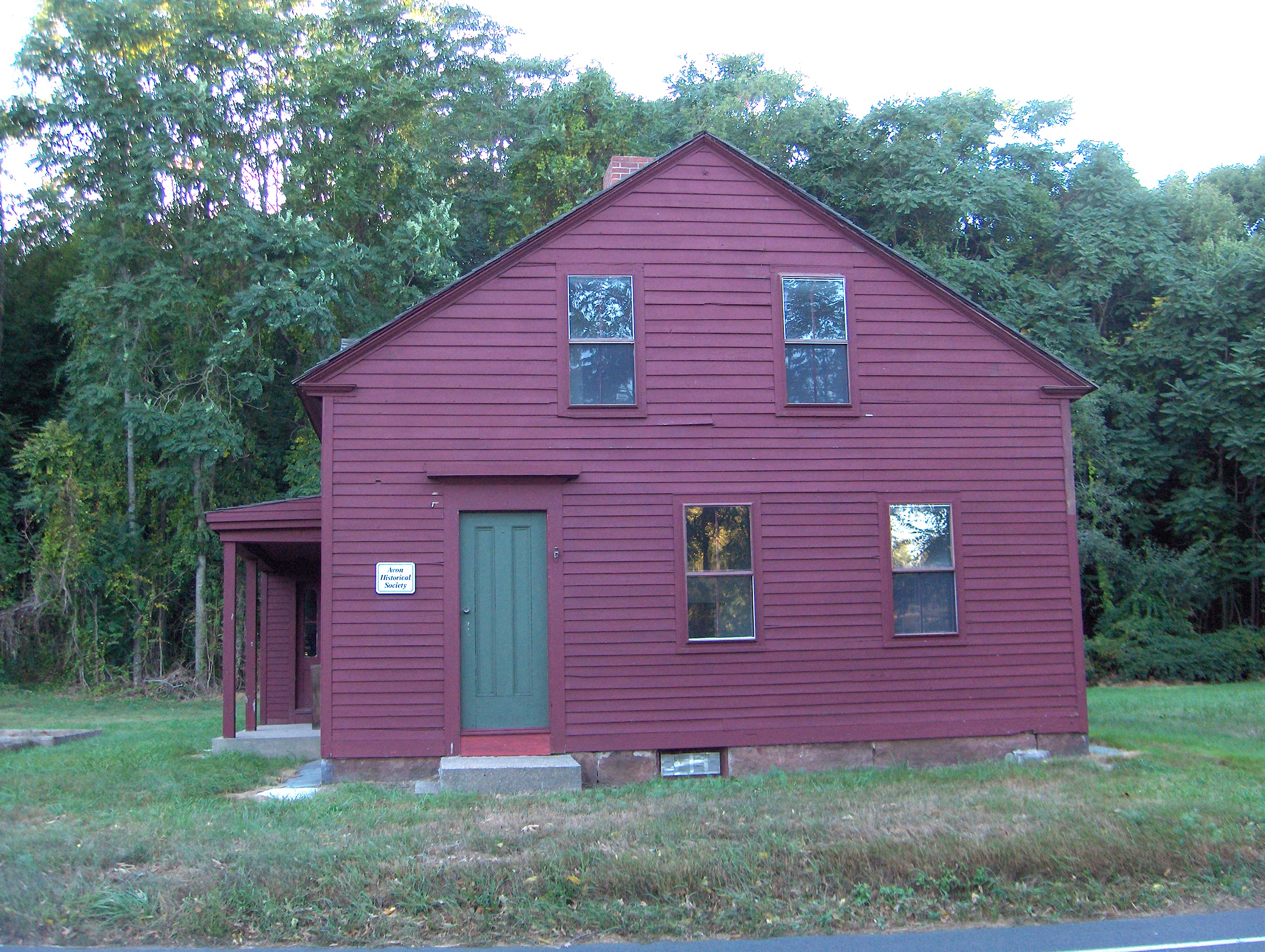
Derrin House, located at the edge of the park

A white-blazed trail begins near the Avon Historical Society's Derrin House on West Avon Road (State Route 167). The trail follows a 1.5-mile (2.4 km), out-and-back route to a rocky crag with views of the surrounding area to the south and west.
