= Drarga =

Rural commune and town in Souss-Massa, Morocco

Drarga الدراركة ⴷⴷⵔⴰⵔⴳⴰ
- rural commune
- Interactive map of Drarga
- Coordinates: 30.38°N 9.48°W
- Country: Morocco
- Region: Souss-Massa
- Province: Agadir-Ida Ou Tanane

Population (2022)
  - Total: 126,512
  - Density: 216/km^{2} (560/sq mi)
- Time zone: UTC+0 (GMT)
- Postal code: 80650

Drarga or Drargua (Arabic: الدراركة) is a rural commune and town in western Morocco, situated in the suburban area of Agadir, in the Souss-Massa region. The 2004 census recorded a population of 17,059 inhabitants in the urban centre, which increased to 50,946 inhabitants in the 2014 census. The commune as a whole recorded a population of 126,000 in the 2014 census. The town is notably the site of Crocoparc Agadir, a crocodile park.
