= Aqesri =

Coordinates: 30.7352°N 9.5333°W

- Rural commune and town
- Interactive map of Aqesri
- Country: Morocco
- Region: Souss-Massa
- Province: Agadir-Ida Ou Tanane

Population (2004)
  - Total: 4,873
- Time zone: UTC+0 (GMT)

Aqesri is a small town and rural commune in Agadir-Ida Ou Tanane Prefecture, Souss-Massa, Morocco. At the time of the 2004 census, the commune had a total population of 4873 people living in 857 households.
