= Agadir-Ida Ou Tanane Prefecture =

Subdivision of Souss-Massa, Morocco

Coordinates: 35.7667°N 5.8000°W

Agadir-Ida Ou Tanane Prefecture عمالة اكادير اداوتنان ⵜⴰⵎⵏⴱⴰⴹⵜ ⵏ ⵓⴳⴰⴷⵉⵔ ⵉⴷⴰⵡⵜⴰⵏⴰⵏ
- Prefecture
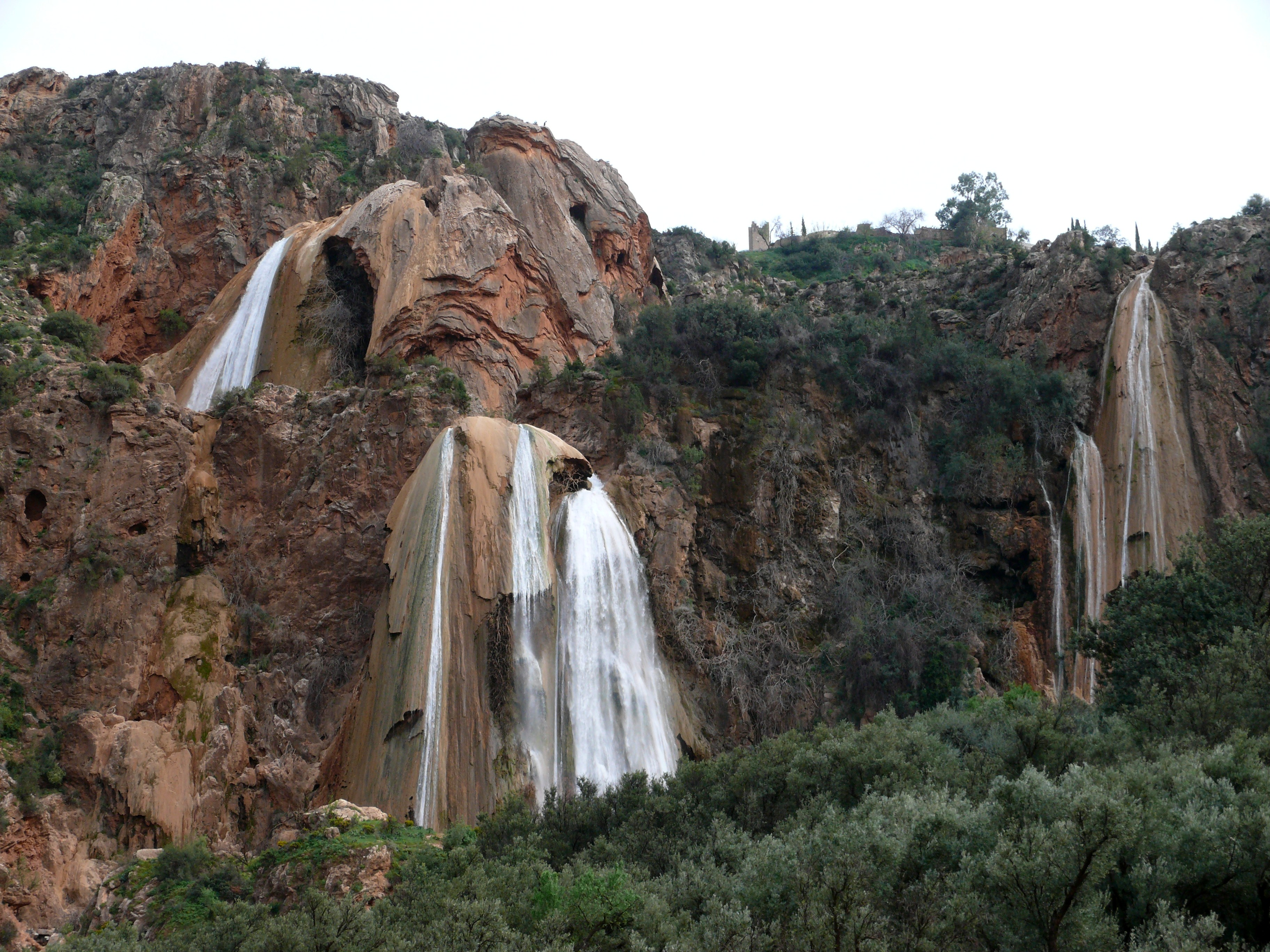
- Imouzzer Ida Ou Tanane falls Taghazout Moulay Abdellah dam, Tamri
- Interactive map of Agadir-Ida Ou Tanane Prefecture
- Country: Morocco
- Region: Souss-Massa
- Administrative headquarters: Agadir

Government
  - Governor: Saaïd Amzazi

Area
  - Total: 2,297 km^{2} (887 sq mi)

Population (2024)
  - Total: 721,431
  - Density: 314.1/km^{2} (813.5/sq mi)
- Time zone: UTC+0 (GMT)

The prefecture of Agadir-Ida Ou Tanane (Arabic: عمالة اكادير اداوتنان, Standard Moroccan Tamazight: ⵜⴰⵎⵏⴱⴰⴹⵜ ⵏ ⵓⴳⴰⴷⵉⵔ ⵉⴷⴰⵡⵜⴰⵏⴰⵏ) is a largely urban subdivision of the Souss-Massa region of Morocco. on the Atlantic coast, it had 721,431 inhabitants in 2024. It covers 2,297 square kilometers.

== Geography ==
The prefecture is bordered by the Atlantic Ocean to the west, the province of Essaouira to the north, that of Taroudant to the east and by the prefecture of Inezgane Ait Melloul to the south.

== Demography ==
2014	2024
598,757	721,431

== Subdivisions ==
Communes of Agadir-Ida Ou Tanane Prefecture

The prefecture is divided administratively into one municipality and twelve rural communes :

=== Rural communes ===
Name	Geographic code	Households (2024)	Population (2024)	Notes
Amskroud	001.05.01.	2395	9648	
Aourir	001.07.03.	11696	46032	Urban centre: Aourir (44,406 inhabitants; 11,284 households)
Aqesri	001.07.05.	914	3333	
Aziar	001.07.07.	618	2053	
Drargua	001.05.09.	25472	107621	Urban centre: Drargua (78,830 inhabitants; 18,648 households)
Idmine	001.05.11.	728	2715	
Imouzzer Ida Ou Tanane	001.07.13.	1094	4087	
Imsouane	001.07.15.	1910	7246	
Tadrart	001.07.21.	881	2899	
Taghazout	001.07.23.	1393	4861	
Tamri	001.07.25.	4899	19790	
Tiqqi	001.07.29.	1695	6378	

=== Municipalities ===
Name	Geographic code	Households (2024)	Population (2024)
Agadir	001.01.01.	143553	504768
