= Tiqqi =

Coordinates: 29°52′N 9°04′W

- Rural commune and town
- Interactive map of Tiqqi
- Country: Morocco
- Region: Souss-Massa
- Prefecture: Agadir-Ida Ou Tanane

Population (2004)
  - Total: 10,078
- Time zone: UTC+0 (GMT)

Tiqqi is a small town and rural commune in Agadir-Ida Ou Tanane Prefecture, Souss-Massa, Morocco. At the time of the 2004 census, the commune had a total population of 10,078 people living in 1735 households.
