= Avon High School (Connecticut) =

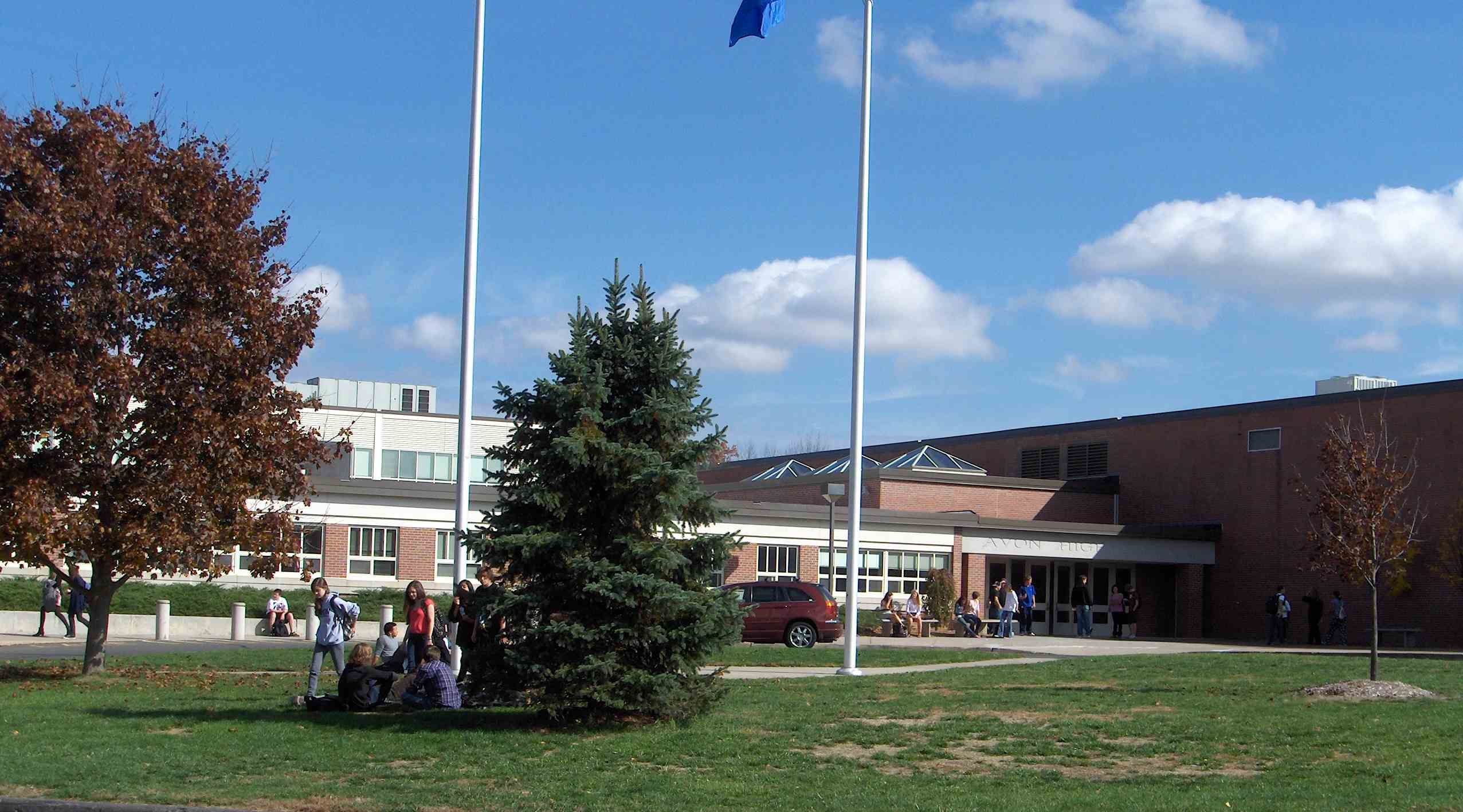

Location
- 510 West Avon Road; Avon, Connecticut 06001; United States; 41°47′00″N 72°51′44″W

Information
- Motto: Scientia Veritas (In knowledge there is truth).
- Founded: 1958 (68 years ago)
- School district: Avon Public Schools
- CEEB code: 070008
- Principal: Kristina Wallace
- Faculty: 81.50 (FTE)
- Grades: 9-12
- Enrollment: 941 (2023–2024)
- Student to teacher ratio: 11.55
- Colors: Blue and white and red
- Athletics conference: Central Connecticut Conference
- Mascot: Falcon
- Accreditation: NEASC
- Website: ahs.avon.k12.ct.us

Avon High School is a public high school in Avon, Connecticut, United States, serving grades 9–12. The principal since the 2026-2027 school year is Kristina Wallace.

== Demographics ==
The 2024–2025 demographic profile is as follows: White 61.4%, Asian 19.7%, Hispanic 8.6%, Black 6%, two or more races 4.1%.

== Renovations ==
The school has undergone extensive renovations in the 2000s. The school started its latest renovation project in 2006, which was completed in the fall of 2008. This included the addition of classrooms, a second gymnasium, a new kitchen and cafeteria, orchestra room, several media centers, and interior cosmetic changes. An indoor track and a softball field were proposed, but were canceled due to a lack of funding. The school was also renovated during 1996 and 1997. The most recent renovations (2018-2019) were done to the football field and track, replacing the grass field with turf and replacing the track.

== Academics ==
In order to graduate, students of the Class of 2023 and beyond must earn a minimum of 25 credits.

== Awards and rankings ==
- In 2023 the school was ranked #7 in Connecticut by Niche.
- In 2024 the school was ranked #606 in the United States by U.S. News & World Report.

== Athletics ==
Avon High School competes in the Central Connecticut Conference and the Connecticut Interscholastic Athletic Conference.

Facilities for field hockey, football, cheerleading, volleyball, basketball, wrestling, track, and girls' lacrosse are located at the high school. Boys' lacrosse and girls' tennis play at the middle school. Soccer, softball, and cross country have home bases at the Fisher Meadow recreational facility. Baseball plays at the Buckingham recreational facility. The Swimming and Diving team practice and compete at Cornerstone Aquatics Center in West Hartford. The crew team's home base is at Spring Pond at Fisher Meadows, in Avon, Connecticut.

=== Fall ===
- Cross country — boys' and girls'
- Field hockey — girls'
- Football — boys'
- Soccer — boys' and girls'
- Volleyball — girls'
- Cheerleading — boys' and girls'
- Crew — boys' and girls'
- Golf — boys'

=== Winter ===
- Basketball — boys' and girls'
- Swimming and diving — boys' and girls'
- Ice hockey — boys' (Farmington Valley Generals)
- Indoor track — boys' and girls'
- Wrestling — boys'
- Cheerleading — boys' and girls'

=== Spring ===
- Baseball — boys'
- Golf — girls'
- Lacrosse — boys' and girls'
- Outdoor track — boys' and girls'
- Softball — girls'
- Tennis — boys' and girls'
- Crew — boys' and girls'
- Ultimate Frisbee (club sport) — Co-ed

The crew team has won multiple Connecticut Public Schools Rowing Association (CPSRA) state championship races, as well as many local races and titles. In the 2013 CPSRA championship, the girls' team won the Founder's Trophy for the varsity coxed four event. In the 2022 CPSRA championship, the boys' team won the Henry Petty Cup for varsity coxed four event. They often compete in the Head of the Charles Regatta.

Avon High School's club sport, Ultimate Frisbee, won the Division I State Championship in 2018.

=== CIAC State Championships ===
Team	Year
Boys' soccer	1976, 1984, 1985, 1986, 1987, 1988, 1989, 1990, 1995, 1999, 2000, 2004, 2011, 2012, 2014, 2015
Wrestling	1982, 1983, 1987, 1989, 1990, 1993, 1994, 1995, 2023
Boys' tennis	1986, 1994, 2011, 2012, 2013, 2021, 2022, 2023, 2024
Girls' cross country	1984, 1985, 1987, 1994, 2012, 2014, 2015, 2017
Boys' track and field (outdoor)	1964, 1966, 1979, 1980, 1991, 1994
Girls' soccer	2001, 2002, 2003, 2011, 2012
Boys' track and field (indoor)	1964, 1965, 1966, 1968
Boys' cross country	2014, 2019, 2021
Boys' golf	1985, 2017, 2018
Girls' outdoor track	2016, 2018
Boys' basketball	1998, 2005
Field hockey	1983, 1984
Baseball	1962, 1968
Girls' volleyball	2019
Girls' basketball	2008
Girls' tennis	1986
Ice hockey (Farmington Valley Generals)	2018

== Notable alumni ==
- Will Friedle (born 1976), actor and screenwriter
- Nate Laszewski (born 1999), basketball player in the Israeli Basketball Premier League
- Jessica Lundy (born 1966), actress
- Kia McNeill (born 1986), professional NWSL soccer player
- Hank Plona (born 1985), college basketball coach at Western Kentucky
- David Yoo (born 1974), author
