= Crocoparc Agadir =

Zoological park in Agadir, Morocco

CROCOPARC AGADIR
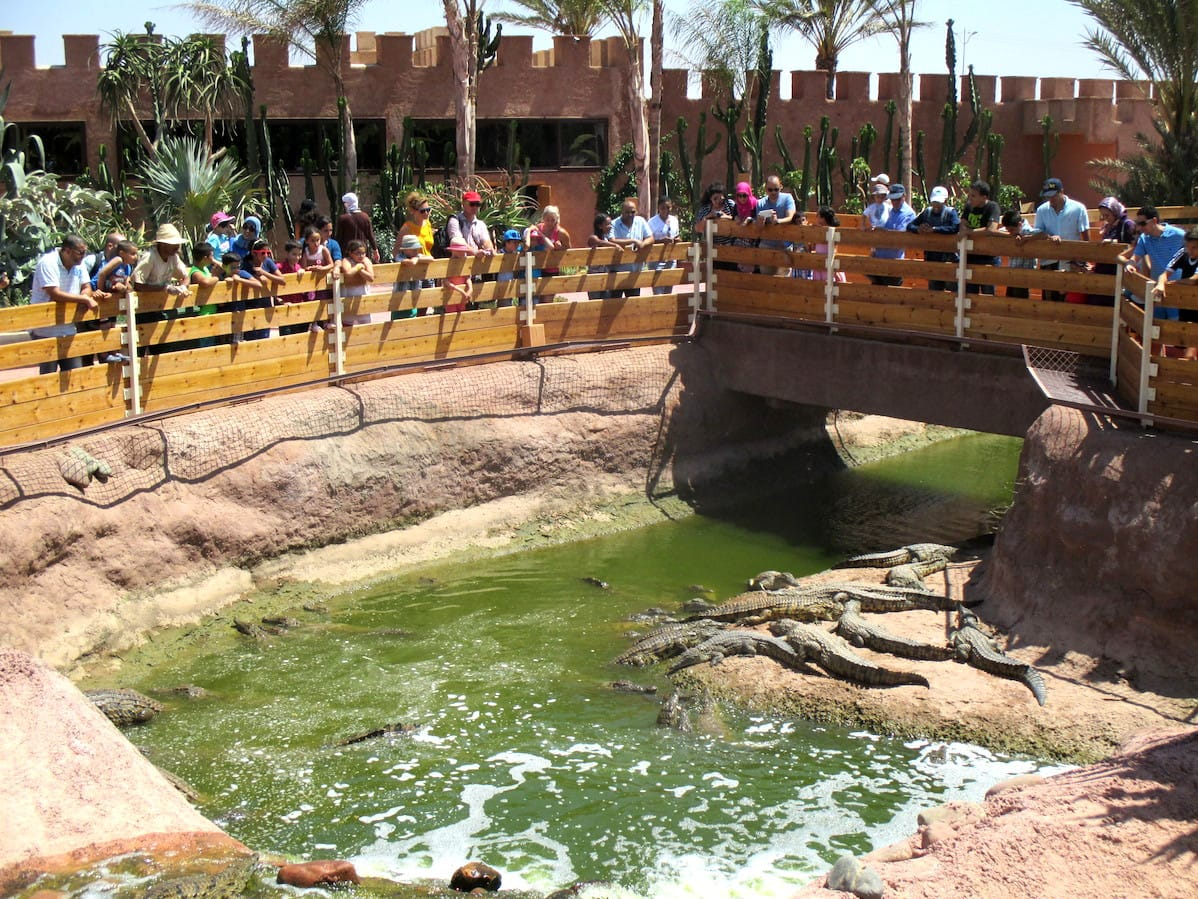
- Interactive map of CROCOPARC AGADIR
- 30.388384°N 9.483677°W
- Date opened: May 31, 2015
- Location: Drarga, Agadir, Morocco
- Land area: 4 ha (9.9 acres)
- No. of animals: 325 Nile crocodiles
- Website: www.crocoparc.com

Crocoparc Agadir is a crocodile zoological park located in the town of Drarga, in the suburbs of Agadir, Morocco. The park opened in May 2015.

The park has 325 Nile crocodiles (Crocodylus niloticus) as well as giant tortoises (Centrochelys sulcata), green iguanas, giant pythons, anacondas, and marmosets.

The park also has a restaurant and leisure spaces in addition to multiple botanical gardens that house a variety of plants from all over the world. Moroccan French-language magazine TelQuel reported in 2015 that the park had 25 million dirhams (£2 million as of May 2021) in initial investments.

== Gallery ==
Crocodiles in the cascades.

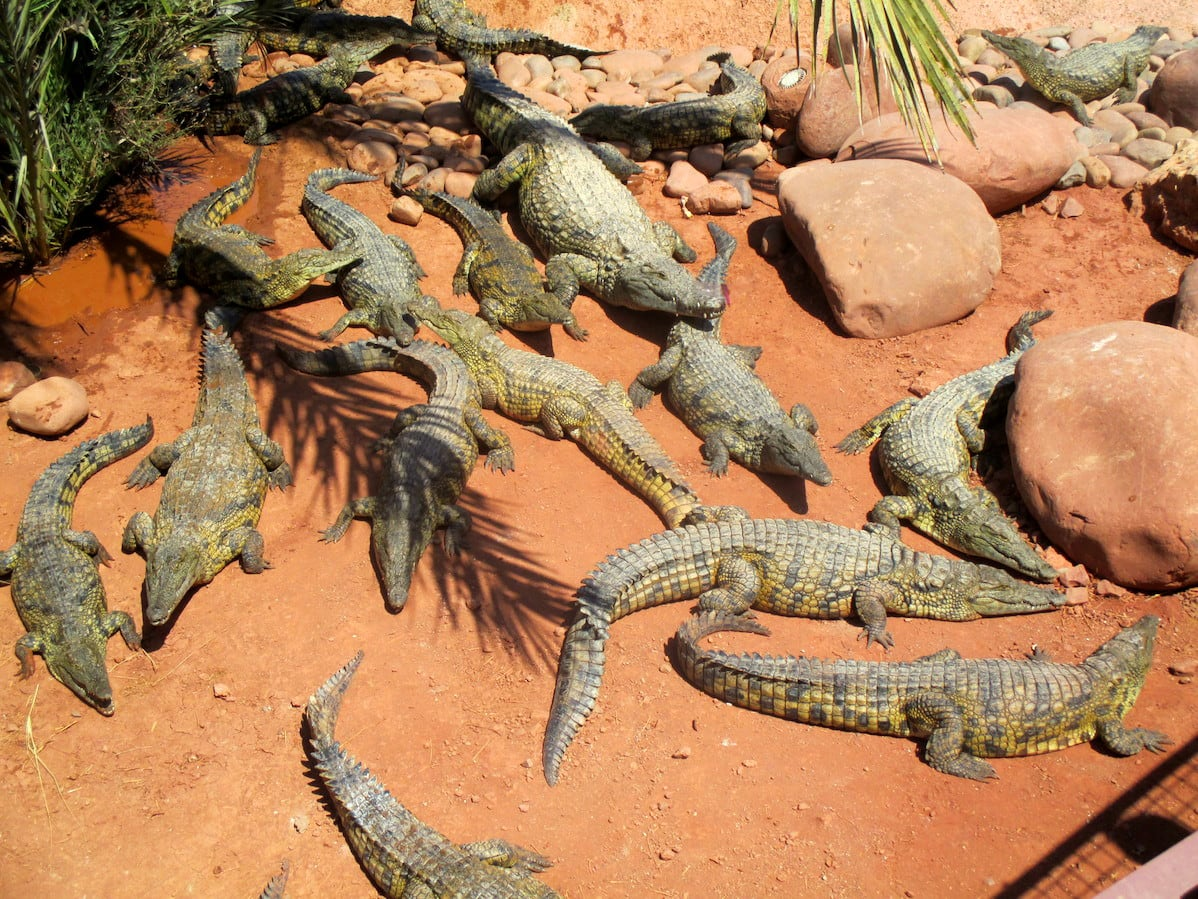
Crocodiles in the sun in one of the areas of the park.

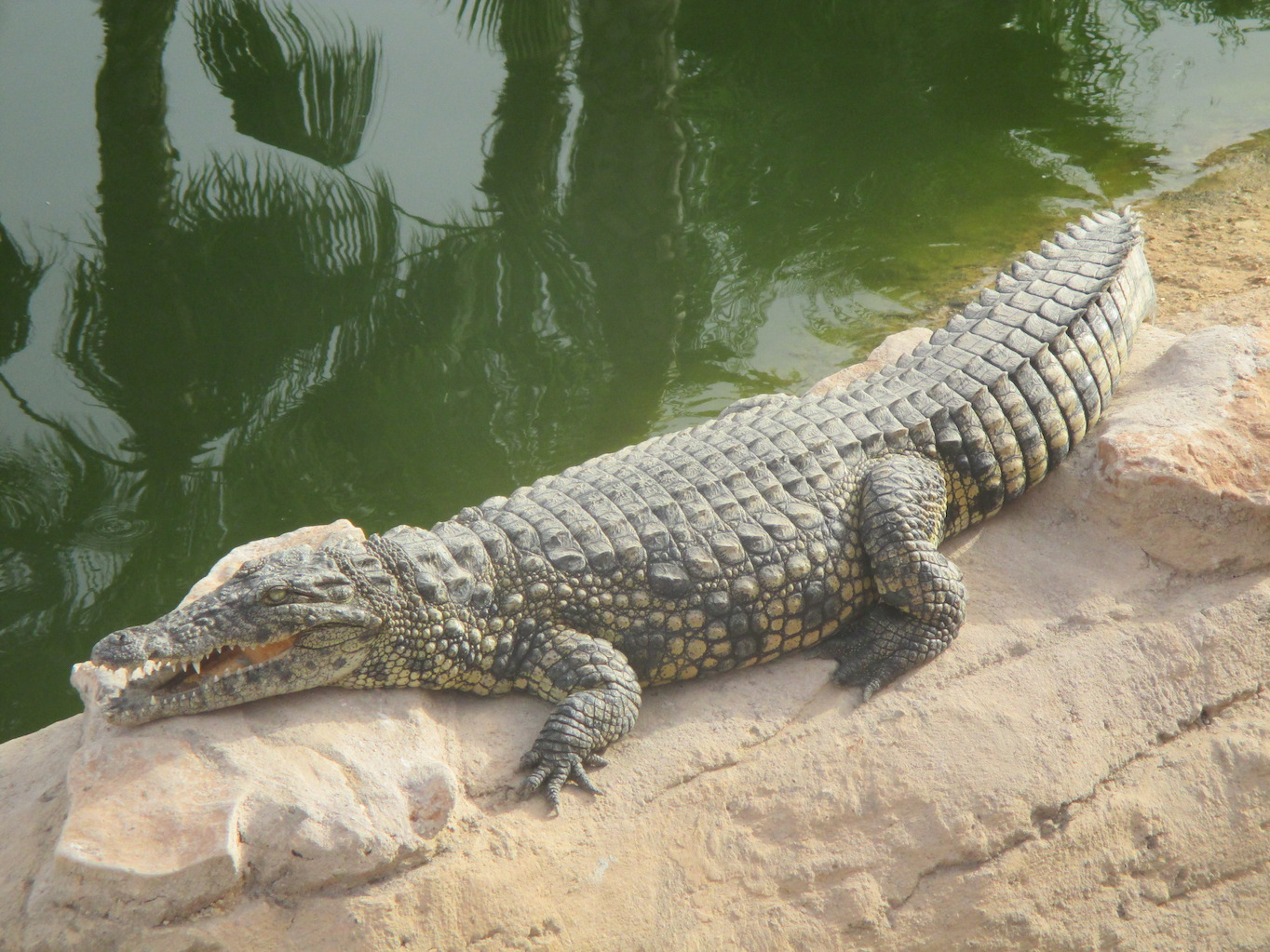
Nile crocodile near one of the three basins.

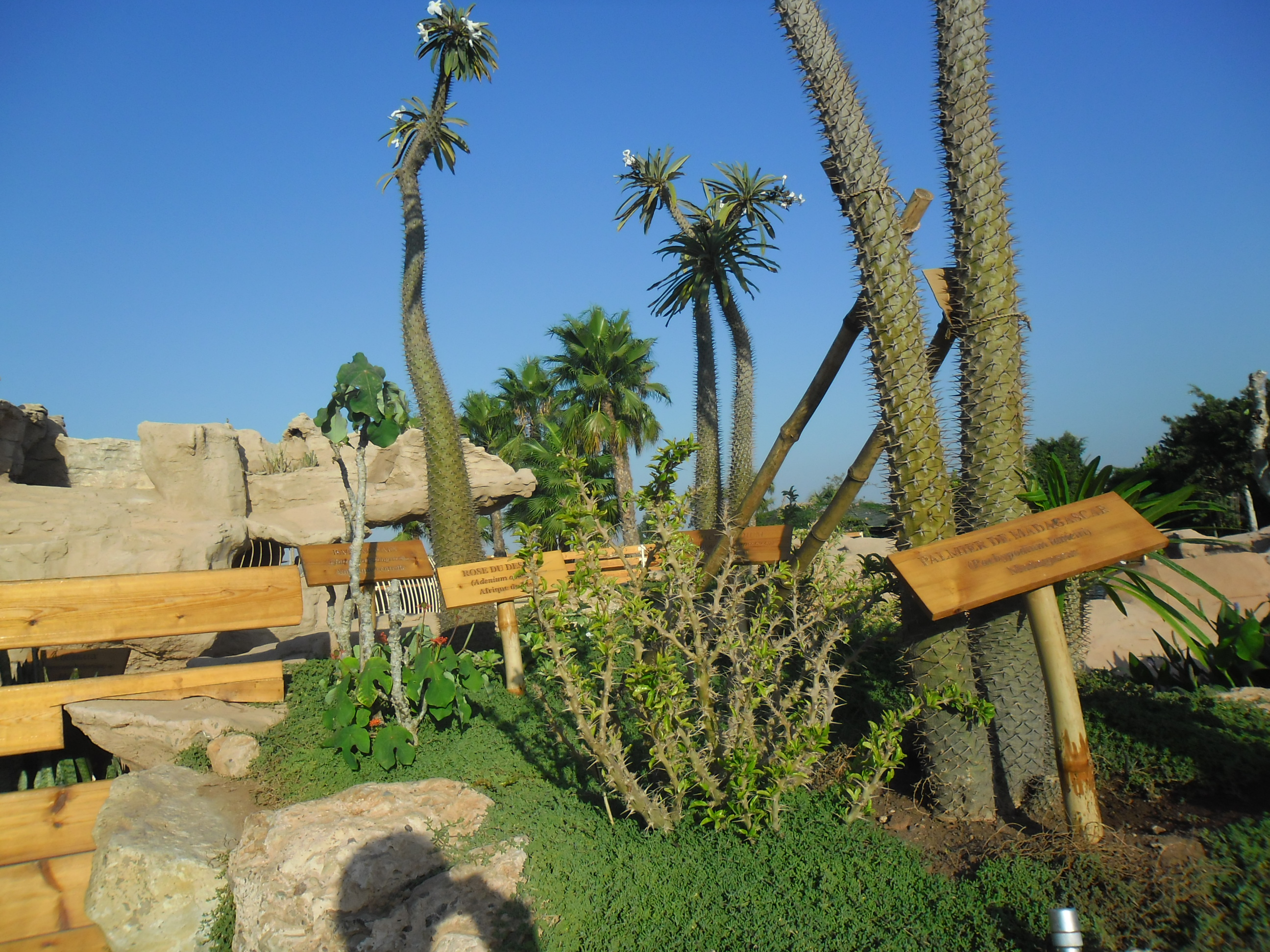
Different plant species in the park

Crocodile-shaped building entrance

Smaller lizards

A large Iguana

A Python

Showroon

== See also ==
- Crocodiles
