= Aziar =

- Rural commune and town
- Location within Morocco
- Coordinates: 30.773°N 9.558°W
- Country: Morocco
- Region: Souss-Massa
- Province: Agadir-Ida Ou Tanane

Population (2004)
  - Total: 3,803
- Time zone: UTC+0 (GMT)

Aziar is a small town and rural commune in Agadir-Ida Ou Tanane Prefecture, Souss-Massa, Morocco. At the time of the 2004 census, the commune had a total population of 3,803 people living in 688 households.
