= Idmine =

- Rural commune and town
- Location within Morocco
- Coordinates: 30.610°N 9.349°W
- Country: Morocco
- Region: Souss-Massa
- Prefecture: Agadir-Ida Ou Tanane

Population (2004)
  - Total: 4,279
- Time zone: UTC+0 (GMT)

Idmine is a small town and rural commune in Agadir-Ida Ou Tanane Prefecture, Souss-Massa, Morocco. At the time of the 2004 census, the commune had a total population of 4279 people living in 671 households.
