= Avon Congregational Church =

Historic church in Connecticut, United States

- U.S. National Register of Historic Places
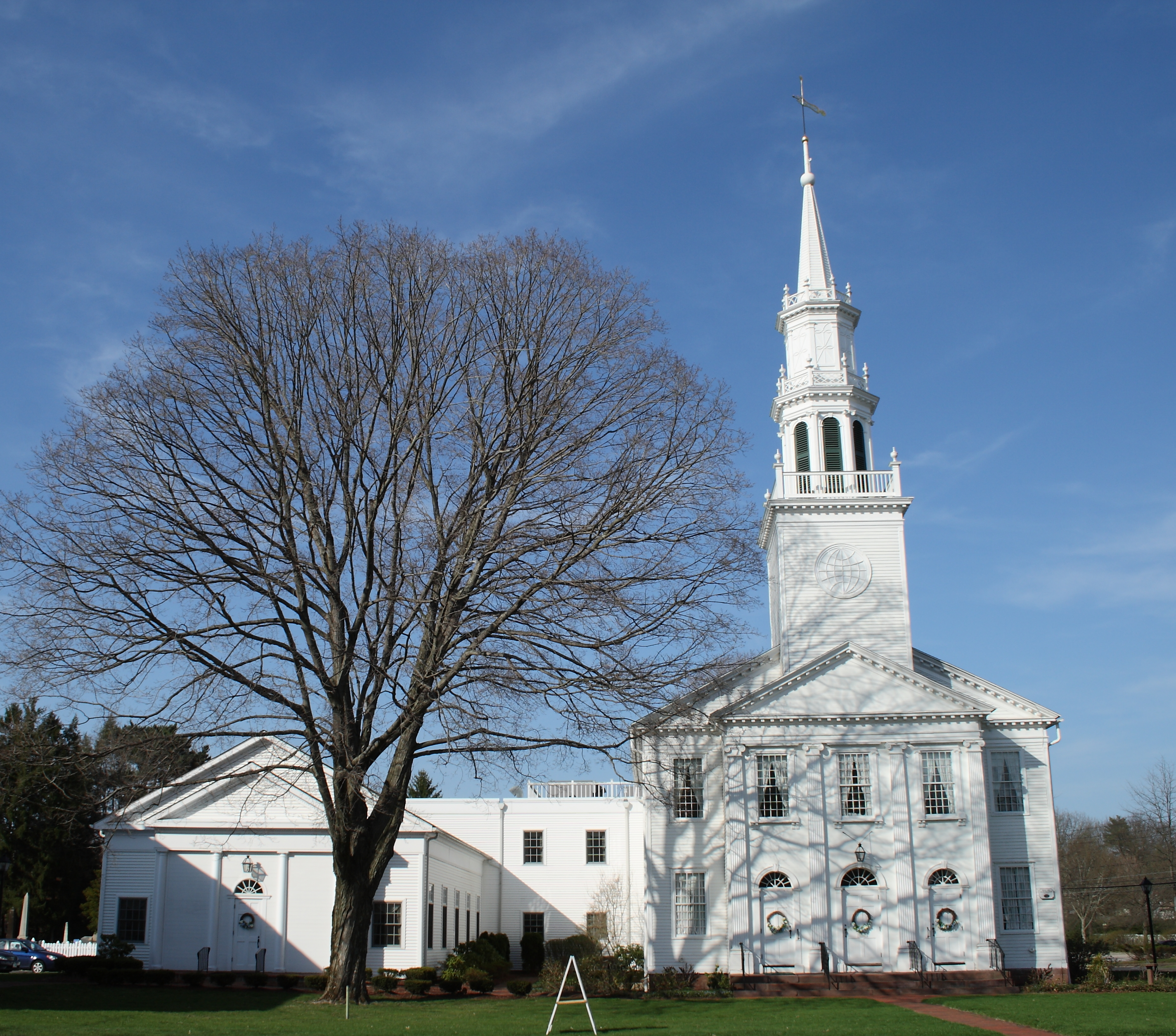

- Location within Connecticut Location within the United States
- Location: 6 West Main Street (Junction of (Route 202) and (Route 44), Avon, Connecticut)
- Coordinates: 41°48′36″N 72°49′52″W
- Area: 1 acre (0.40 ha)
- Built: 1819
- Architect: David Hoadley
- Architectural style: Federal
- NRHP reference No.: 72001342
- Added to NRHP: November 7, 1972

The Avon Congregational Church is a Congregational Church building at 6 West Main Street in Avon, Connecticut. Built in 1819 for a congregation founded in 1754, it is a high-quality example of Federal period architecture, and one of the finest works of architect David Hoadley. The building was listed on the National Register of Historic Places in 1972. The congregation is affiliated with the United Church of Christ.

== Description and history ==
The Avon Congregational Church is prominently located in Avon's town center, at the northwest corner of Route 44 and 202. It is a two-story rectangular wood-frame structure, with a projecting entry section and a multistage tower with steeple. The projecting section consists of three bays, separated by two-story Doric pilasters, with an entry and window above in each bay. It is topped by a fully pedimented modillioned gable. The tower begins with a plain square clapboarded stage, which has a circular panel with a globe motif, and is topped by a low balustrade with urned posts. The next stage is an octagonal belfry with louvered round-arch openings separated by pilasters. The third stage is also octagonal but smaller in footprint, and is capped by a short spire and weathervane. Each of these stages is also surrounded by a low spindled balustrade.

The church congregation was organized in 1754, when the area was still part of Farmington. Its first church building, located on the east bank of the Farmington River, was destroyed by fire in 1817. That congregation then divided, and the present church was completed in 1819 for the western half. The building has been judged one of the finest works of David Hoadley, showing evidence of influence on him by the works of Charles Bulfinch. The church was damaged by fire in 1876, and lost part of its steeple (since restored) in the 1938 New England hurricane.

== See also ==
- National Register of Historic Places listings in Hartford County, Connecticut
