= Tamri =

Tamri التامري ⵜⴰⵎⵔⵉ
- Rural commune and town
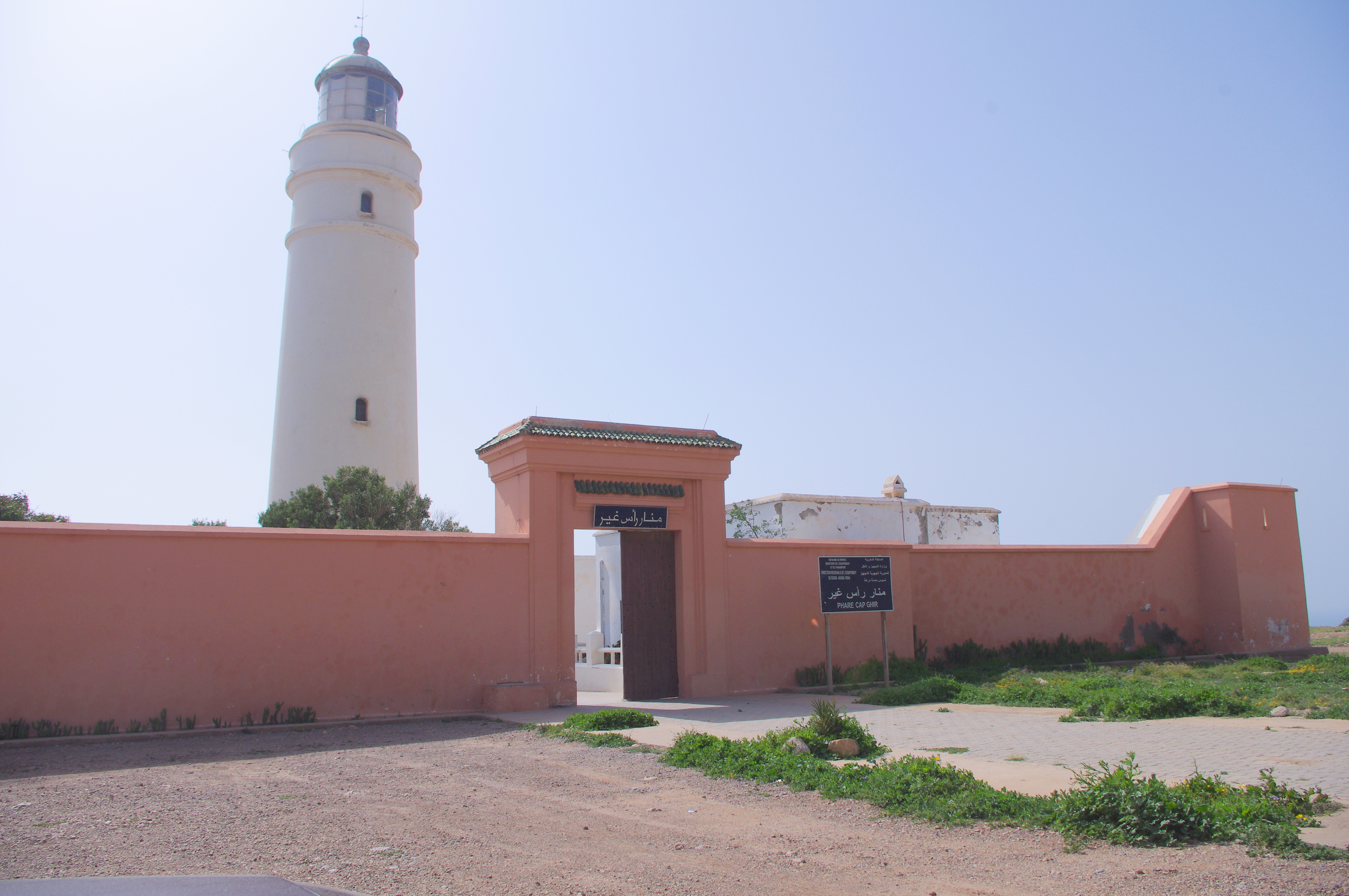
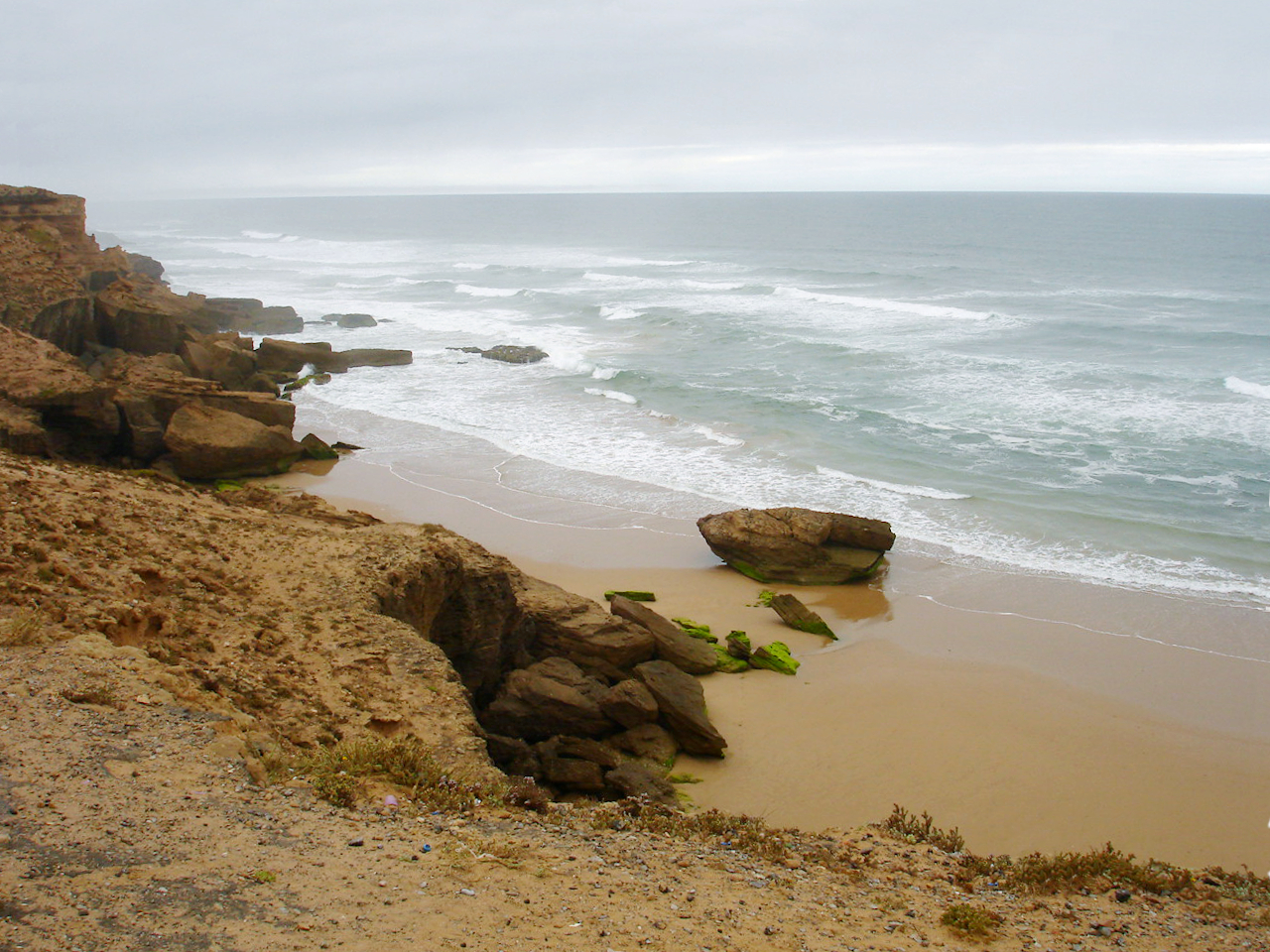
- Interactive map of Tamri
- Country: Morocco
- Region: Souss-Massa
- Prefecture: Agadir-Ida Ou Tanane

Population (2004)
  - Total: 17,442
- Time zone: UTC+0 (GMT)

Tamri is a small town and rural commune in Agadir-Ida Ou Tanane Prefecture, Souss-Massa, Morocco. At the time of the 2004 census, the commune had a total population of 17,442 people living in 2927 households.

Aghroud is a rainbow-colored former fishing village famous for its bright facades located about 27 to 40 km north of Agadir, it has a wide, 2.5 km-long sandy Atlantic Beach.

== Plane crash ==
The Agadir air disaster was a chartered Boeing 707 passenger flight on Sunday, August 3, 1975, that crashed into a mountain on approach to Agadir Inezgane Airport, Morocco. All 188 passengers and crew on board were killed. It is the deadliest aviation disaster involving a Boeing 707, as well as the deadliest in Morocco.
