= Aourir =

Aourir أورير ⴰⵡⵔⵉⵔ
- Rural commune
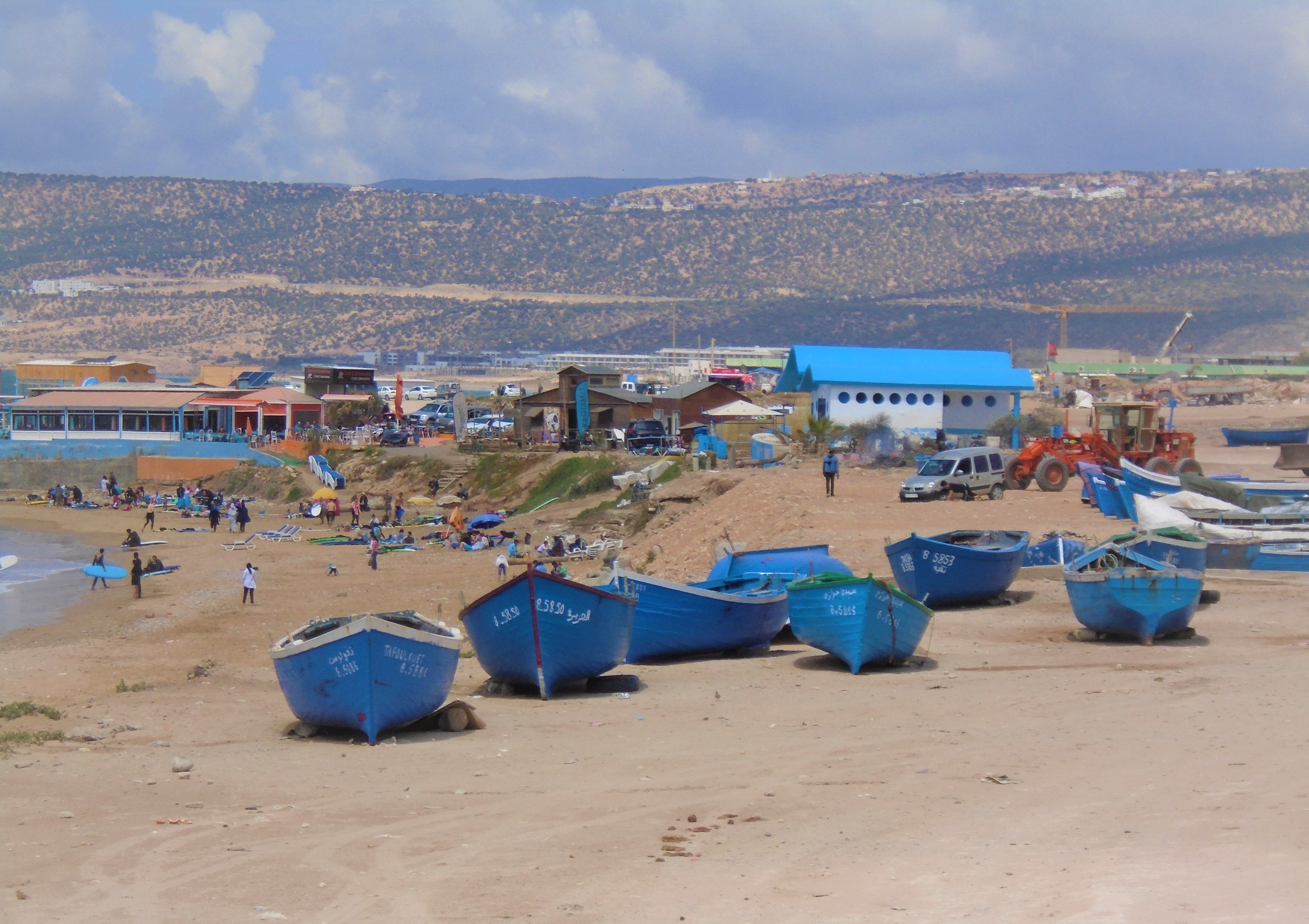
- Interactive map of Aourir
- Coordinates: 30°29′00″N 9°38′00″W
- Country: Morocco
- Region: Souss-Massa
- Province: Agadir-Ida Ou Tanane

Population (2004)
  - Rural commune: 36,948
  - Urban: 35,365
- Time zone: UTC+0 (GMT)

Aourir (Standard Moroccan Tamazight: ⴰⵡⵔⵉⵔ, romanized: Awrir) is a town and rural commune in Morocco, situated in the suburban area of Agadir (at 12 km from the city of Agadir). According to the 2004 census the town had a population of 21,796 inhabitants. It produces an important quantity of bananas.

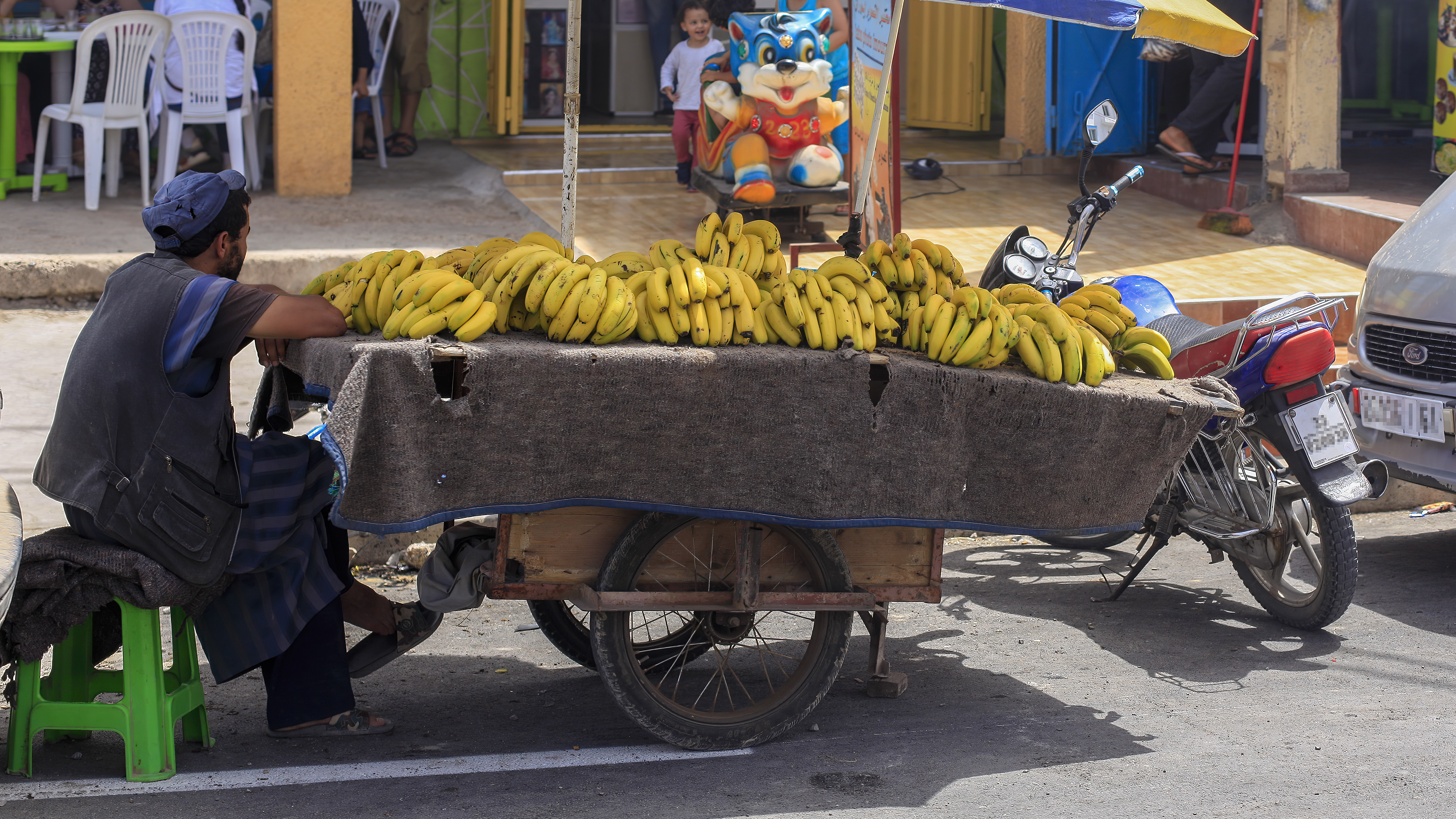
A fruit seller in Aourir, the town is known for its bananas, and the town itself is banana shaped
