= Pine Grove Historic District (Avon, Connecticut) =

Historic district in Connecticut, United States

- U.S. National Register of Historic Places
- U.S. Historic district
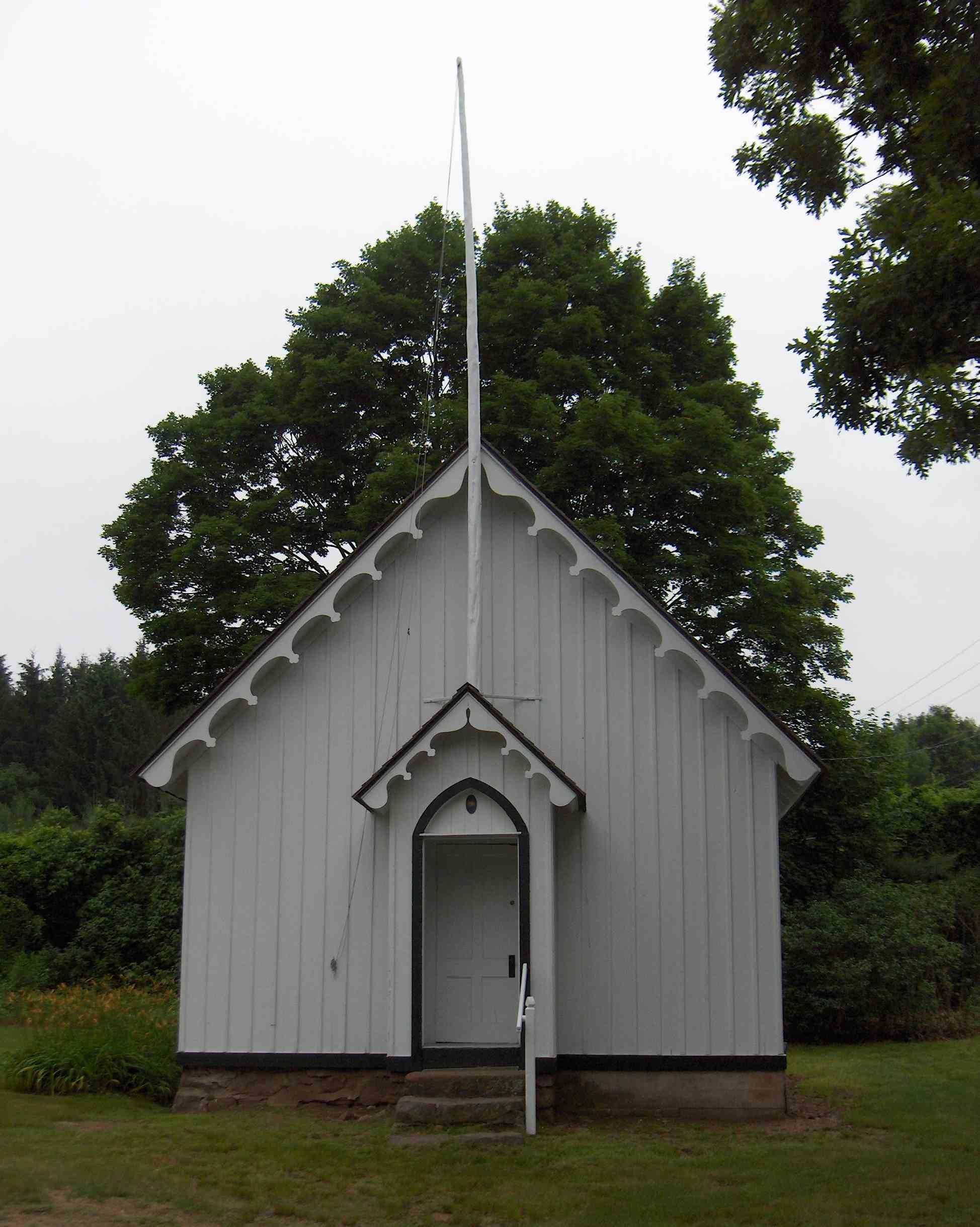

- Location within Connecticut Location within the United States
- Location: West Avon and Harris Roads, Avon, Connecticut
- Coordinates: 41°46′9″N 72°51′25″W
- Area: 121 acres (49 ha)
- Built: 1789
- Built by: Tefft, Thomas A.; Multiple
- Architectural style: Greek Revival, Italianate, Gothic Revival
- NRHP reference No.: 80004066
- Added to NRHP: February 11, 1980

The Pine Grove Historic District encompasses a well-preserved collection of primarily 19th-century farmsteads, located near one another and a local district school building in Avon, Connecticut. Centered around the Junction of West Avon and Harris Roads are four 19th-century farmsteads, one dating to the 18th century, and the 1865 Gothic Revival Pine Grove School. The district was listed on the National Register of Historic Places in 1980.

== Description and history ==
The town of Avon was incorporated in 1830 out of part of Farmington. It was before then largely farmland worked by people who lived in Farmington village. In the 19th century, agricultural practices in the region began to shift from subsistence to the production of cash crops, most notably tobacco. The Thompson and Woodford families were major landowners in what is now south-central Avon, and both were among the early landowners to build houses on their farmland. The Thompson House has not survived; it originally stood at 712 West Avon Road, where the 1856 Gothic Oliver Thompson House now stands. It was moved for the construction of the latter house, and was razed in the 1960s. The oldest surviving house in the area is that of Isaac Woodford (687 West Avon Road), built in 1789.

The historic district is basically linear in shape, extending north-south along West Avon Road between Thompson Road and Harris Road. The Pine Grove School stands at the southwest corner of West Avon and Harris. Southeast of the school on Harris Road is the David Rood House (1820), which anchors the southern end of the district. The district includes five farmhouses, all of woodframe construction and finished in clapboards. All were built between 1789 and 1856, and are stylistically diverse, ranging from the Federal styling of the Woodford House to the Italianate of the Thompson house. The school is distinctive with its Gothic bargeboard trim.

== See also ==
- National Register of Historic Places listings in Hartford County, Connecticut
