= Imouzzer Ida Ou Tanane =

Coordinates: 30.673°N 9.480°W

Imouzzer Ida Ou Tanane Imuzzar Ida Utanan
- Rural commune and town
- Interactive map of Imouzzer Ida Ou Tanane
- Country: Morocco
- Region: Souss-Massa
- Province: Agadir-Ida Ou Tanane

Population (2004)
  - Total: 6,351
- Time zone: UTC+0 (GMT)

Imouzzer Ida Ou Tanane (Berber: Imuzzar Ida Utanan, Arabic: إيموزار إيدا وتنان) is a small town and rural commune in Agadir-Ida Ou Tanane Prefecture, Souss-Massa, Morocco. At the time of the 2004 census, the commune had a population of 6,351 living in 1,153 households.
