= Amskroud =

Rural commune and town in Souss-Massa, Morocco

Amskroud ⴰⵎⵙⴽⵔⵓⴹ Amskruḍ امسكروض
- Rural commune and town
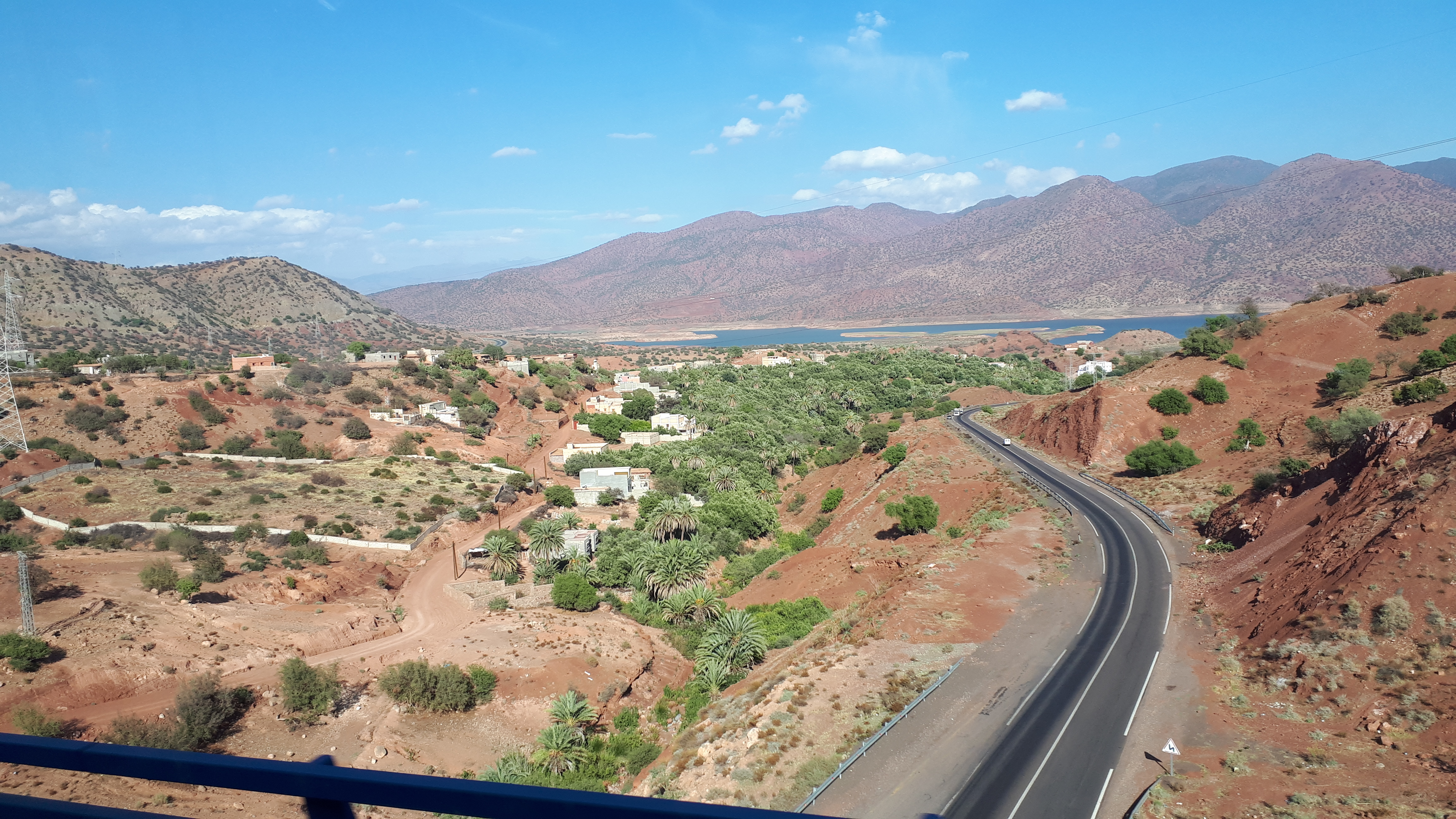
- Road in the commune of Amskroud
- Interactive map of Amskroud
- Coordinates: 30°31′51″N 9°19′42″W
- Country: Morocco
- Region: Souss-Massa
- Province: Agadir-Ida Ou Tanane

Population (2004)
  - Total: 10,020
- Time zone: UTC+0 (GMT)

Amskroud (Standard Moroccan Tamazight: ⴰⵎⵙⴽⵔⵓⴹ) is a small town and rural commune in Agadir-Ida Ou Tanane Prefecture, Souss-Massa, Morocco. It is located about 40 kilometres (25 mi) by road northeast of Agadir. At the time of the 2004 census, the commune had a total population of 10020 people living in 1687 households.
