= Tadrart, Morocco =

Rural commune and town in Souss-Massa, Morocco

Coordinates: 30°46′15.52″N 9°27′40.31″W

Location of the Prefecture of Agadir Ida-Outanane within Morocco

Tadrart is a village in Agadir-Ida Ou Tanane Prefecture in the Souss-Massa region of Morocco.

Between the censuses in 1994 and 2004, the population of the village fell from 5,739 to 5,703 inhabitants.
