= Fermata Arts Foundation =

Fermata Arts Foundation logo

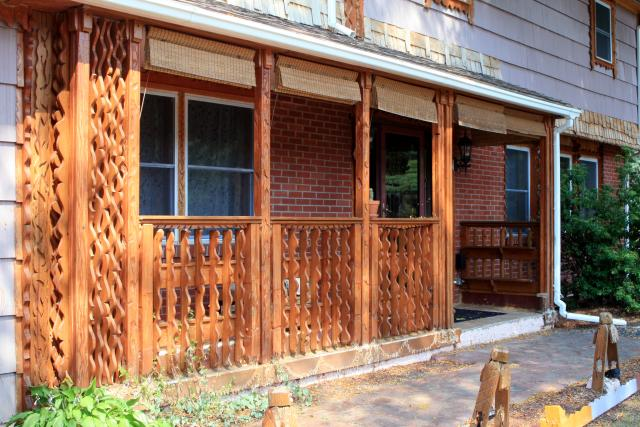
"brentwood, no. 24", The office of Fermata Arts Foundation in Avon, Conn.

The Fermata Arts Foundation (FAF) is a New England non-profit organization promoting a new spectrum of communication through philosophy and poetics of the arts and architecture, between the countries of the post-soviet space and the West, with the stated goal to "aid in the preservation of peace through mutual respect, understanding and cooperation".

Fermata Arts Foundation programs involve the participation of grade schools, high schools and colleges and universities. For example, "Ideal House", a drawing exchange program, was joined by grade school students and their schools in eight Eastern European countries, the US and Italy.

The Directors of the corporation come from a variety of backgrounds, echoing the interdisciplinary nature of the Foundation's activities. Dr. Pamela Gay, for instance, is an astronomer and academic. Board member James Woods, SJ, is Dean of the College of Advancing Studies at Boston College.

== Organization ==
The origin of Fermata Arts Foundation can be traced to 1994. From its offices in Avon, Connecticut, Fermata Arts Foundation currently operates programs in Ukraine, Bulgaria, Latvia, Kazakhstan, Kyrgyz Republic, Tajikistan, Georgia (country) and the Russian Federation. Fermata Arts Foundation was named a principal partner by UNESCO in the 2010 International Year for the Rapprochement of Cultures.

== See also ==
- Pamela L. Gay
- Mark Jarzombek
