= Avon, Connecticut =

- Town
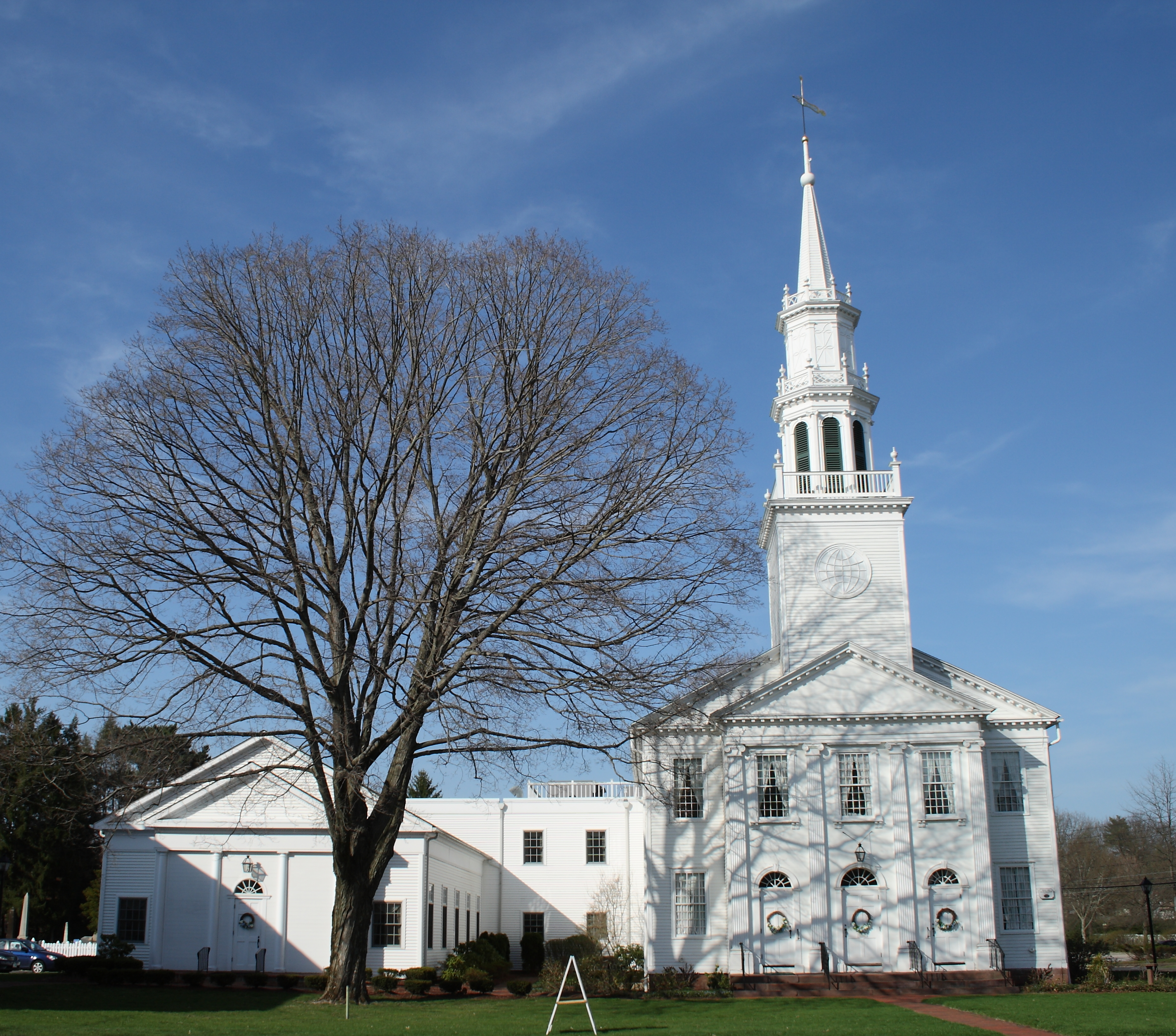
- Avon Congregational Church, built in 1819

- Flag Seal

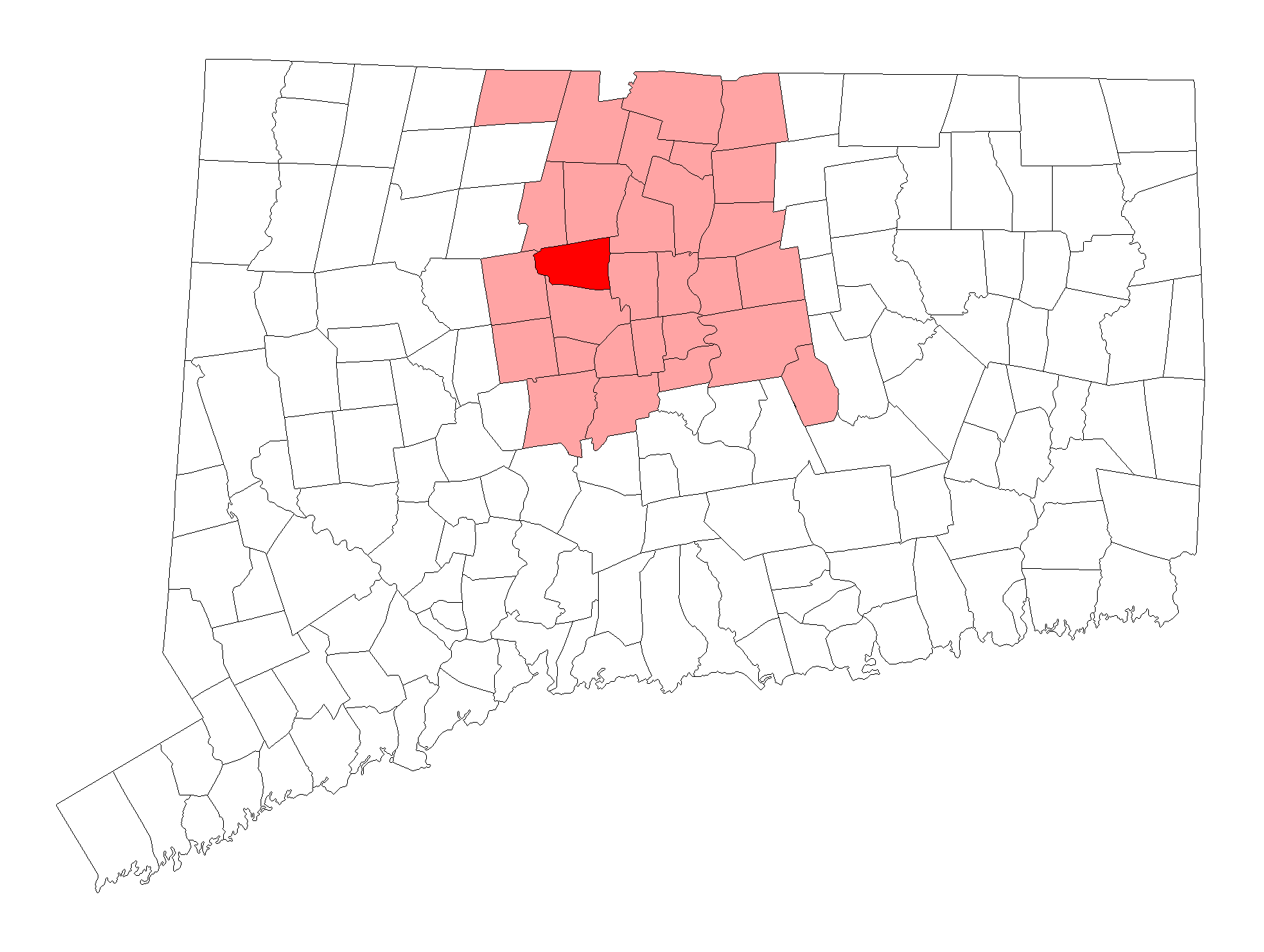
- Interactive map of Avon, Connecticut
- Coordinates: 41°47′40″N 72°51′28″W
- Country: United States
- State: Connecticut
- Region: Capitol Region
- County: Hartford
- Settled: 1645
- Incorporated: 1830
- Villages: Avon; West Avon

Government
  - Type: Council-manager
  - Town manager: Brandon Robertson
  - Town council: Barbara Ausiello (D); Erin Barthel (D); Margaret Bratton (R); Dan Polhamus (D); Anthony Weber (D)

Area
  - Total: 23.5 sq mi (60.9 km^{2})
  - Land: 23.1 sq mi (59.9 km^{2})
  - Water: 0.39 sq mi (1.0 km^{2})
- Highest elevation: 879 ft (268 m)
- Lowest elevation: 148 ft (45 m)

Population (2020)
  - Total: 19,795
  - Density: 856/sq mi (330/km^{2})
- Time zone: UTC−5 (Eastern)
  - Summer (DST): UTC−4 (Eastern)
- ZIP Code: 06001
- Area codes: 860/959
- FIPS code: 09-02060
- GNIS feature ID: 0213385
- Website: www.avonct.gov

Avon (/ˈeɪvɑːn/ AY-vahn) is a town in the Farmington Valley region of the Capitol Planning Region, Connecticut, United States. As of 2020, the town had a population of 19,795.

== History ==
At the end of the last Ice Age, c.12,400 years BP of the Younger Dryas, nomadic peoples built a campsite adjacent to the river that would become known as the Farmington River. They were apparently the first people to populate the region that would become known as southern New England, including the region that would become Avon. Over the Paleoindian period the site was revisted multiple times by other nomadic peoples until it gradually became buried by sediment from the river's occasional flooding. In the winter of 2019, the campsite remains were excavated in Avon, along with stone tools and artifacts constructed from materials in neighboring regions.

Avon was settled by Europeans in 1645 and was originally a part of neighboring Farmington. In 1750, the parish of Northington was established in the northern part of Farmington, to support a Congregational church more accessible to the local population. Its first pastor was Ebenezer Booge, a graduate of Yale Divinity School who arrived in 1751. The Farmington Canal's opening in 1828 brought new business to the village, which sat where the canal intersected the Talcott Mountain Turnpike linking Hartford to Albany, New York. Hopes of industrial and commercial growth spurred Avon to incorporate. In 1830, the Connecticut General Assembly incorporated Northington as the town of Avon, after County Avon in England. Such expansion never came and, in the 1900s, the rural town became a suburban enclave.

In the 1960s Avon rejected the proposal for Interstate 291 coming through the southern edge of the town and successfully denied the expressway going through the town.

U.S. Route 44 passes through a section of Talcott Mountain known as Avon Mountain, between Avon and West Hartford. Several vehicle crashes prompted the state to modify Route 44 for safety.

== Geography ==
According to the United States Census Bureau, the town has a total area of 23.5 square miles (61 km^{2}), of which 23.1 square miles (60 km^{2}) is land and 0.4 square miles (1.0 km^{2}) is water.

The East side of Avon is flanked by Talcott Mountain, part of the Metacomet Ridge, a mountainous trap rock ridgeline that stretches from Long Island Sound to near the Vermont border. Talcott Mountain is a popular outdoor recreation resource notable for its towering western cliff faces. The 51-mile (82 km) Metacomet Trail traverses the Talcott Mountain ridge. The Western side of Avon is borders by the Farmington River with Huckleberry and Woodford Hills nearby, both hills are coved in suburban households, with Huckleberry hill having the Huckleberry Hill Recreation Area. Also on Woodford hill there is the Buckingham neighborhood. The center of town lies flatter that both the east and western parts of town, with both the middle and high school's being in this area that West Avon is located in. More to the east is where the Farmington River also cuts through the town, right near the Avon Congregational Church and a large shopping area and Strip Mall's following Route 44 and U.S. Route 202

== Demographics ==
Historical population
Census	Pop.	Note	%±
1830	1,025		—
1840	1,001		−2.3%
1850	995		−0.6%
1860	1,059		6.4%
1870	987		−6.8%
1880	1,057		7.1%
1890	1,182		11.8%
1900	1,302		10.2%
1910	1,337		2.7%
1920	1,534		14.7%
1930	1,738		13.3%
1940	2,258		29.9%
1950	3,171		40.4%
1960	5,273		66.3%
1970	8,352		58.4%
1980	11,201		34.1%
1990	13,937		24.4%
2000	15,832		13.6%
2010	18,098		14.3%
2020	18,932		4.6%
U.S. Decennial Census

As of the 2020 census, Avon had a population of 18,932. The racial composition of the population was 82.3% White, 13.1% Asian, 4.9% Hispanic or Latino, 0.8% Black or African American, 0.7% from other races and 1.6% from two or more races.

As of the 2000 census, there were 15,832 people, 6,192 households, and 4,483 families residing in the town. The population density was 684.8 inhabitants per square mile (264.4/km^{2}). There were 6,480 housing units at an average density of 280.3 per square mile (108.2/km^{2}). The racial makeup of the town was 94.93% White, 0.98% African American, 0.05% Native American, 2.96% Asian, 0.02% Pacific Islander, 0.28% from other races, and 0.77% from two or more races. Hispanic or Latino of any race were 1.57% of the population.

There were 6,192 households, out of which 34.0% had children under the age of 18 living with them, 65.8% were married couples living together, 4.7% had a female householder with no husband present, and 27.6% were non-families. Of all households, 23.5% were made up of individuals, and 9.5% had someone living alone who was 65 years of age or older. The average household size was 2.53 and the average family size was 3.03.

In the town, the population was spread out, with 26.1% under the age of 18, 3.3% from 18 to 24, 26.1% from 25 to 44, 29.5% from 45 to 64, and 15.0% who were 65 years of age or older. The median age was 42 years. For every 100 females, there were 91.8 males. For every 100 females age 18 and over, there were 88.0 males.

In 2022, the median household income was $146,153 and the per capita income for the town was $89,357. About 0.9% of families and 1.7% of the population were below the poverty line, including 1.2% of those under age 18 and 1.9% of those age 65 or over.

== Economy ==
=== Top employers ===
Top employers in Avon according to the town's 2025 Comprehensive Annual Financial Report

#	Employer	# of Employees
1	Town of Avon	719
2	Whole Foods	260
3	Avon Old Farms School	176
4	Avon Health Center, Inc	169
5	Apple Healthcare Inc	131
6	Legere Group Ltd	131
7	Walmart	131
8	OFS Fitel LLC	130
9	Big Y	102
10	ORAFOL Americas Inc.	102

== Arts and culture ==
=== Public library ===
The Avon Free Public Library was founded in 1791. In 1798, a resident offered library services within his home with a collection of 111 titles.

The library is a member of Library Connection, Incorporated, the cooperative regional automated circulation and online catalog database system.

=== Notable locations and organizations ===
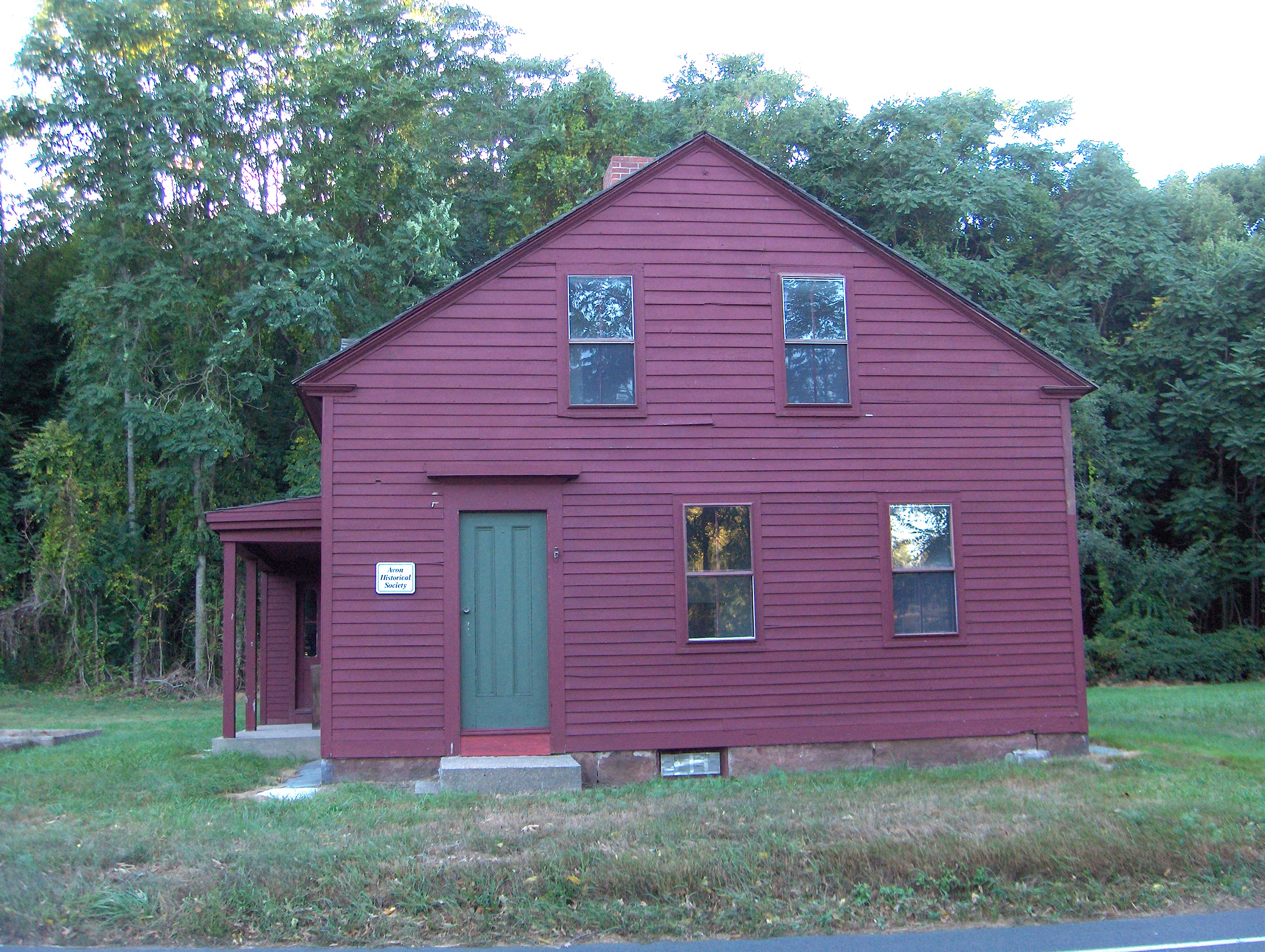
Derrin House

- Avon Congregational Church (1819); listed on the National Register of Historic Places.
- Fermata Arts Foundation, a cultural center promoting ties with post-soviet countries.
- Pine Grove School House, a former schoolhouse.

== Parks and recreation ==
- The Farmington Canal Heritage Trail runs through town.
- Horse Guard State Park is named after the oldest active mounted cavalry unit in the United States, founded in 1788.

== Government ==
Voter registration and party enrollment as of October 29, 2019
Party	Active voters	Inactive voters	Total voters	Percentage
Republican	3,967	207	4,174	29.59%
Democratic	4,007	222	4,229	29.98%
Unaffiliated	5,098	441	5,539	39.27%
Minor parties	153	11	164	1.16%
Total	13,225	881	14,106	100%

Presidential Election Results
Year	Democratic	Republican	Third Parties
2024	60.4% 7,012	37.7% 4,382	1.9% 222
2020	60.9% 7,299	37.3% 4,469	1.8% 219
2016	53.7% 5,675	41.5% 4,390	4.8% 502
2012	46.1% 4,830	52.9% 5,542	1.0% 105
2008	53.5% 5,698	45.6% 4,868	0.9% 100
2004	48.3% 4,925	50.3% 5,141	1.4% 148
2000	45.7% 4,326	50.0% 4,741	4.3% 408
1996	43.5% 3,606	48.3% 4,014	8.2% 685
1992	44.0% 3,983	37.4% 3,390	18.6% 1,680
1988	38.2% 3,117	60.8% 4,966	1.0% 82
1984	30.8% 2,258	69.0% 5,063	0.2% 13
1980	26.8% 1,815	54.8% 3,702	18.4% 1,243
1976	34.6% 1,864	65.0% 3,498	0.4% 23
1972	33.4% 1,585	65.9% 3,131	0.7% 32
1968	37.5% 1,485	58.5% 2,308	4.0% 154
1964	56.2% 1,763	43.8% 1,374	0.00% 0
1960	42.2% 1,185	57.8% 1,621	0.00% 0
1956	29.0% 663	71.0% 1,626	0.00% 0

Once predominantly Republican, Avon has shifted to be friendlier to Democrats in recent elections. In 2008, Avon voters gave Democrat Barack Obama the majority of the vote. After flipping back red for Mitt Romney in 2012, town voters gave a majority to Hillary Clinton in 2016. In 2020, Democrat Joe Biden won Avon by more than 20 points. These recent shifts mirrored a national trend of suburban voters shifting leftward.

=== State ===
General Assembly Representatives
Representative	Chamber	District	Party
Eleni Kavros DeGraw	House of Representatives	17th	Dem
Tammy Exum	House of Representatives	19th	Dem

Connecticut Senate
Representative	Chamber	District	Party
Paul Honig	Senate	8th	Dem

== Education ==
=== Public schools ===
The Avon Public Schools district contains one high school (Avon High School), one middle school (Avon Middle School) for grades 7–8, an intermediate school (Thompson Brook School) for grades 5–6, and two elementary schools (Roaring Brook School and Pine Grove School).

=== Private schools ===
In addition, the Avon Old Farms School, a private, all-boys boarding school, is also located in Avon on Old Farms Road

== Notable people ==
- Joseph Wright Alsop IV, politician and insurance executive; father of Joseph Alsop V
- Craig Burley, former soccer player and commentator for ESPN and BT Sports
- Will Friedle, actor
- Mike Golic, radio announcer for ESPN
- Madison Kennedy, swimmer
- Jessica Lundy, actor
- Kia McNeill, professional soccer player
- Joel Quenneville, former NHL player and coach of the Chicago Blackhawks
- Karl Ravech, Host of Baseball Tonight
- Stuart Scott, ESPN reporter who covered the NBA and other sports
- Trey Wingo, ESPN
- Wilford Woodruff, Fourth President of the Church of Jesus Christ of Latter-day Saints
