= Agadir =

City in Souss-Massa, Morocco

Agadir: أكادير (Arabic); ⴰⴳⴰⴷⵉⵔ (Tachelhit)
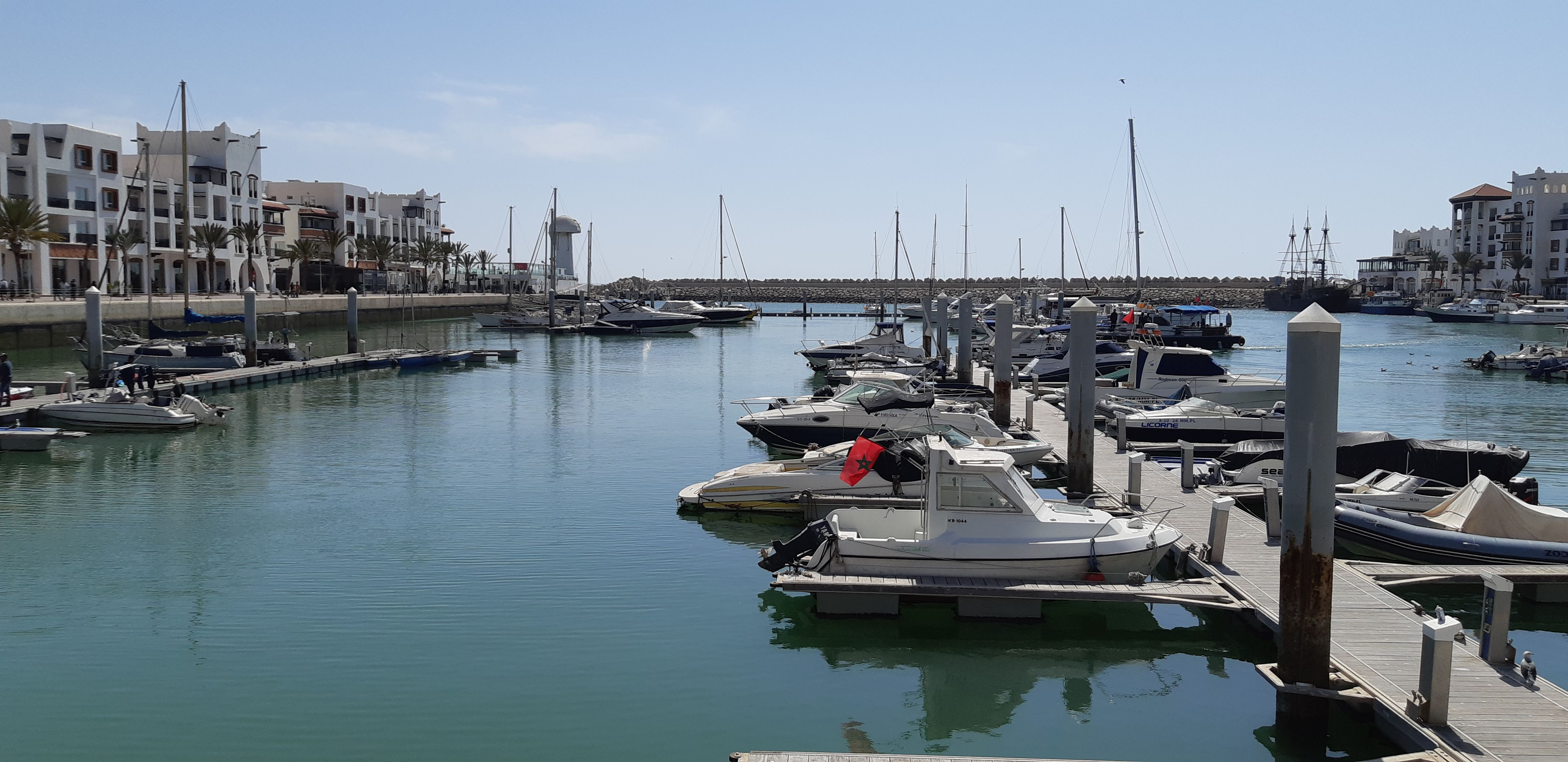
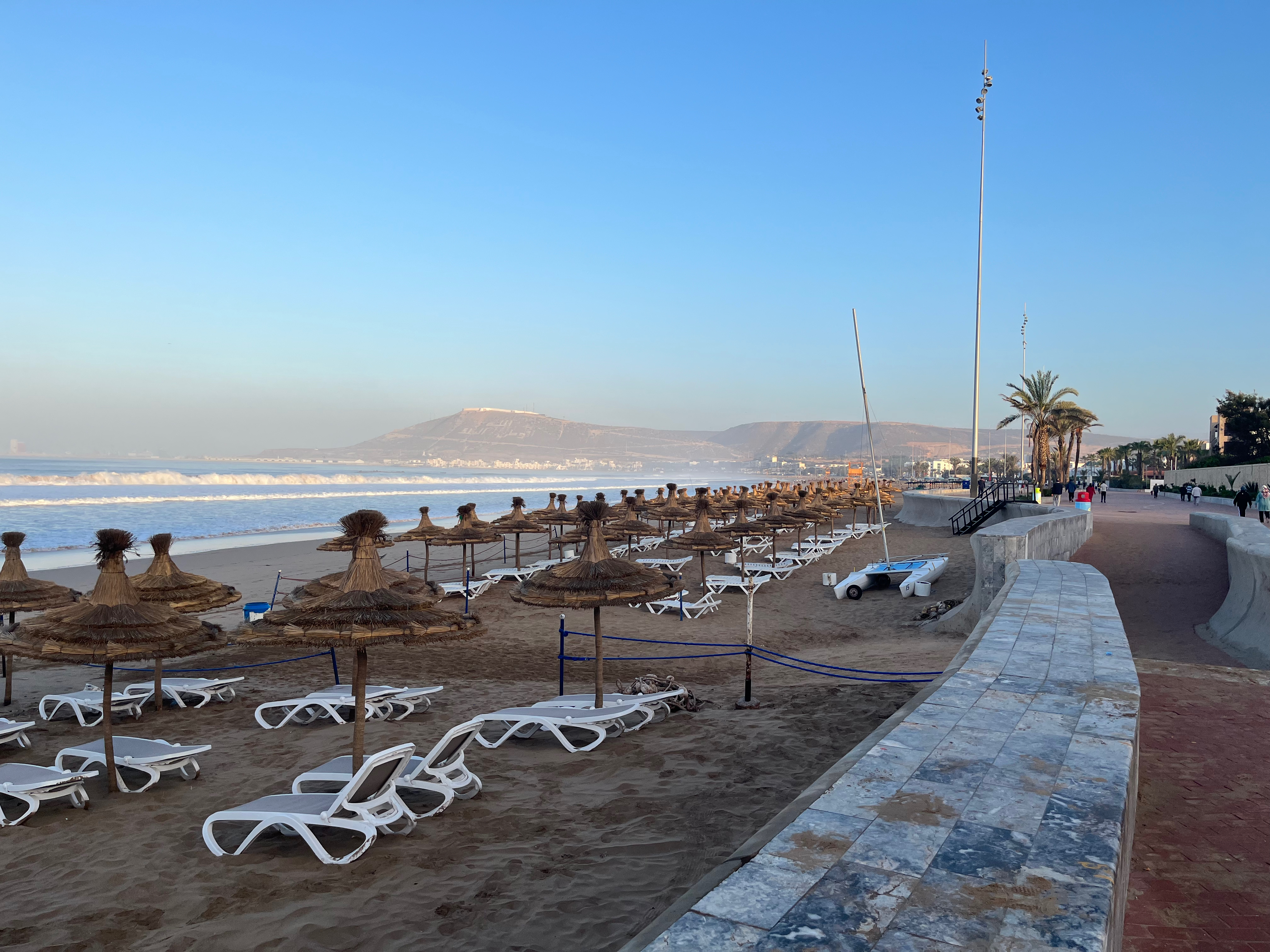
- A view of Agadir from Agadir Oufla The Kasbah of Agadir Oufla The Marina Seafront A view of the sea-side Belvedere park

- Interactive map of Agadir
- Coordinates: 30°25′17″N 9°34′59″W
- Country: Morocco
- Region: Souss-Massa
- Prefecture: Agadir-Ida Ou Tanane

Government
  - Mayor: Aziz Akhannouch (RNI)

Area
  - Land: 51.2 km^{2} (19.8 sq mi)
- Elevation: 0 to 278 m (0 to 912 ft)

Population (2024)
  - Total: 504,768
  - Rank: 10th in Morocco
  - Density: 9,860/km^{2} (25,500/sq mi)
- Time zone: UTC+0 (GMT)
- Postal code: 82000
- Website: Agadir (in Arabic, Standard Moroccan Tamazight, and French)

Agadir (Arabic: أكادير or أڭادير, romanized: ʾagādīr, pronounced [ʔaɡaːdiːr]; Tachelhit: ⴰⴳⴰⴷⵉⵔ) is a major city in Morocco, on the shore of the Atlantic Ocean near the foot of the Atlas Mountains, just north of the point where the Souss River flows into the ocean, and 509 kilometres (316 mi) south of Casablanca. Agadir is the capital of the Agadir-Ida Ou Tanane Prefecture and of the Souss-Massa economic region.

Agadir is one of the major urban centres of Morocco. The commune of Agadir recorded a population of 504,768 in the 2024 Moroccan census. The greater Agadir area also includes the communes of Dcheira (110k), Inezgane (137k), Ait Melloul (210k), Drargua (107k), Lqliaa (101k), Temsia (52k) and Aourir (45k) and counts well over 1.2 million inhabitants overall.

Agadir is known for being the capital of Amazigh culture in Morocco. It is one of the few big Moroccan cities where Tamazight, one of Morocco's two official languages, is spoken by more than half of the population. The native variety to the region, Tachelhit, is spoken by 222,000 speakers, representing 53.7% of the entire population. Agadir is also a place for many festivals related to Amazigh culture, such as The New Amazigh Year, celebrated on 13 January every year throughout the city, especially in the downtown area. The Bilmawen Festival is another old Berber tradition celebrated in the suburbs of the city. Additionally, the Issni N’Ourgh International festival is a festival for Amazigh films. Agadir is also the birthplace of many of the pillars of Shilha and Amazigh music, such as Izenzaren, Oudaden, and many others.

It was the site of the 1911 Agadir Crisis that exposed tensions between France and Germany, foreshadowing World War I. The city was destroyed by an earthquake in 1960; it has been completely rebuilt with mandatory seismic standards. It is now the largest seaside resort in Morocco, where foreign tourists and many residents are attracted by an unusually mild year-round climate. Since 2010 it has been well served by low-cost flights and a motorway from Tangier.

The mild winter climate (January average midday temperature 20.5 °C/69 °F) and good beaches have made it a major "winter sun" destination for northern Europeans.

== Etymology ==
The name Agadir is a common Amazigh noun, meaning 'wall, enclosure, fortified building, citadel'. This noun is attested in most Amazigh languages. It may come from the Tuareg word aǧādir ('wall' or 'bank') or from Phoenician gadir ('wall' or 'fortress'). The former word may also be a loanword from the latter. The Phoenician etymology, if correct, would be the same as that of Cádiz in Spain.

There are many more towns in Morocco called Agadir. The city of Agadir's full name in Tashelhit is Agadir Ighir or Agadir-n-Irir, literally 'the fortress of the cape', referring to the nearby promontory named Cape Ighir on maps (a pleonastic name, literally 'Cape Cape').

== History ==
=== Early occupation ===
The oldest known map that includes an indication of Agadir is from 1325: at the approximate location of the modern city, it names a place it calls Porto Mesegina, after a Berber tribe name that had been recorded as early as the 12th century, the Mesguina (also known as the Ksima). At the end of the medieval period, Agadir was a town of some renown. The first known mention of its name, Agadir al-harba, was recorded in 1510. (Note: The name suggests that there was a Wednesday market – the souk el-arba close to a collective granary. Chronique de Santa-Cruz du Cap de Gué (in French), Paris, 1934)

=== Portuguese occupation ===
In the late 15th century the Portuguese began to occupy positions along the Moroccan coast. In 1505 the Portuguese nobleman João Lopes de Sequeira occupied the area. He built a wooden castle at the foot of a hill, near a spring, and a Portuguese colony named Santa Cruz do Cabo do Gué was created. The site still bears the name of Funti or Founti (from the Portuguese word fonte, meaning "fountain"). The castle was later bought by the King of Portugal on 25 January 1513.

The Portuguese presence elicited growing hostility from the local population of the Sous region, who initiated a years-long economic and military blockade of the port. In 1510 Muhammad al-Qa'im, the leader of a Sharifian family in that had established themselves in the Sous, was declared leader of the local military efforts against the Sous. His descendants went on to found the Sa'di dynasty which rose to power over the following decades and eventually established their capital at Marrakesh. In 1540 the Sa'di sultan Muhammad al-Shaykh occupied the main hill (now Agadir Oufla) above the Portuguese and installed artillery to prepare an attack on the fortress below. The siege of the colony began on 16 February 1541 and was successfully concluded on 12 March of the same year.

Six hundred Portuguese survivors were taken prisoner, including the governor, Guterre de Monroy, and his daughter, Dona Mecia. The captives were redeemed by the holy men, who were mostly from Portugal. Dona Mecia, whose husband was killed during the battle, became the wife of Sheikh Mohammed ash-Sheikh but died in childbirth in 1544. In the same year, Mohammed ash-Sheikh released Guterre de Monroy, whom he had befriended. After this, the Portuguese were forced to abandon most of the Moroccan areas that they had acquired control of between 1505 and 1520, including Agadir, Safi and Azemmour. By 1550, Portugal's only holding in Morocco was Mazagan (now El Jadida), Tangier and Ceuta. Following defeat in Morocco, the Portuguese turned their attention to India and Brazil, nations that they had more success pacifying.

The story of the Portuguese presence (from the installation in 1505 until their defeat on 12 March 1541) is described in a manuscript (published for the first time, with a French translation by Pierre de Cenival, in 1934) entitled "Este He O Origem e Comeco e Cabo da Villa de Santa Cruz do Cabo de Gue D'Agoa de Narba", written by an anonymous author who was captured in 1934 and was imprisoned for five years in Taroudannt (cf. "Santa Cruz do Cabo de Gue d'Agoa de Narba – Estudo e Crónica", Joao Marinho e Santos, José Manuel Azevedo e Silva e Mohammed Nadir, bilingual edition, Viseu 2007).

=== Moroccan rule ===
After the Sa'di victory the site was then left unoccupied for years until Muhammad al-Shaykh's successor, Abdallah al-Ghalib (r. 1557–1574), built a new fortress (or kasbah) on the hilltop. It was now called Agadir N'Ighir (literally: "fortified granary of the hill" in Tachelhit. (Note: Ighir (pronounced irrhir) later meaning shoulder or height.)

In the 17th century, during the reign of the Berber dynasty of Tazerwalt, Agadir was a harbour of some importance, expanding its trade with Europe. There was, however, neither a real port nor a wharf. Agadir traded mainly in sugar, wax, copper, hides and skins. In exchange, Europeans sold their manufactured goods there, particularly weapons and textiles. Under the reign of Sultan Moulay Ismail (1645–1727) and his successors, the trade with France, which had previously been an active partner, diminished, and trade with the English and Dutch increased.

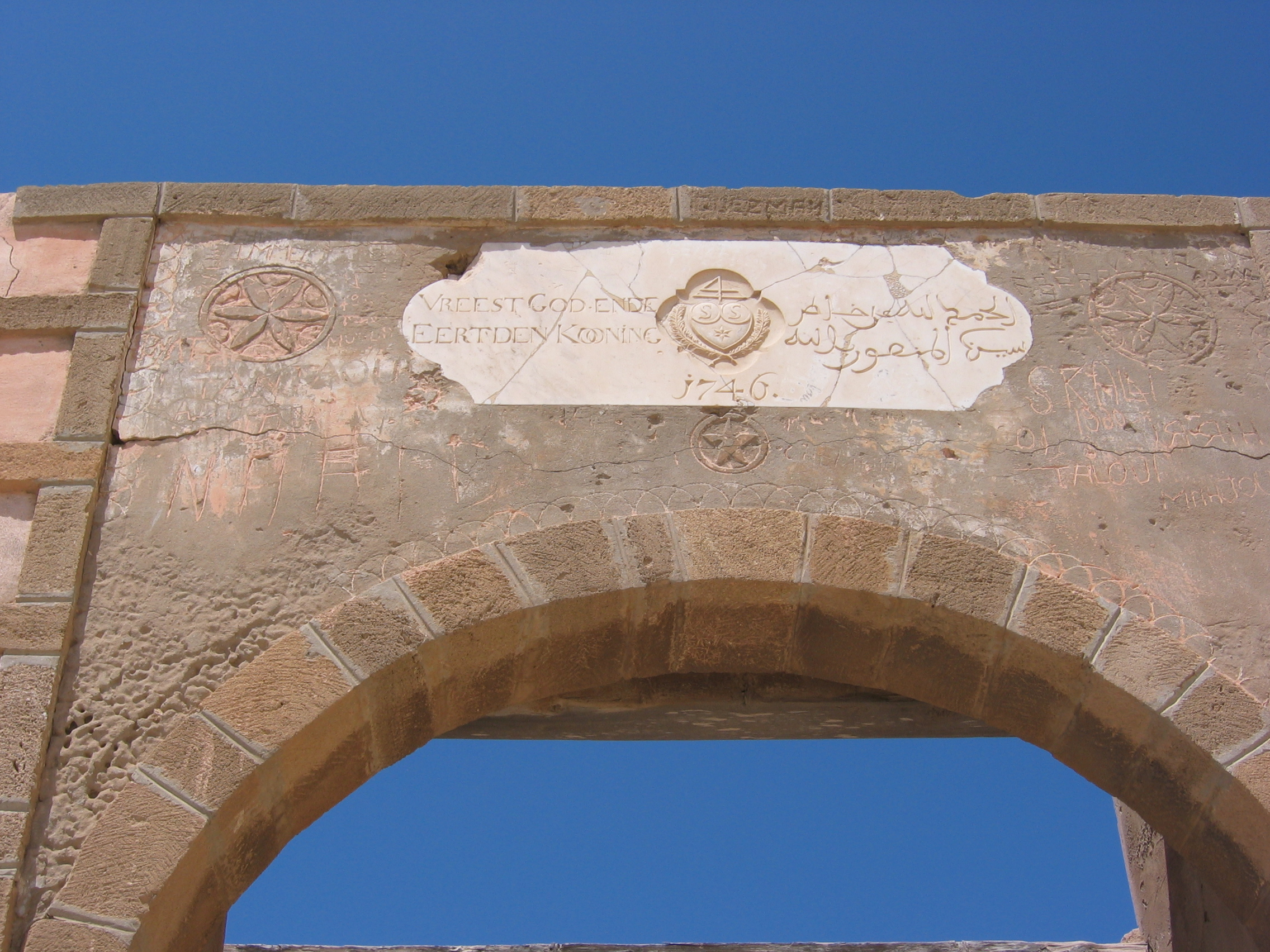
The entrance of the Kasbah

In 1731, the town was completely destroyed by an earthquake. After that, Agadir's harbour was ordered to be closed, and an alternative, Essaouira, was established farther north.

After a long period of prosperity during the reigns of the Saadian and Alawite dynasties, Agadir declined from 1760 because of the pre-eminence given to the competing port of Essaouira by the Alawite Sultan Mohammed ben Abdallah who wanted to punish the Souss for rebelling against his authority. This decline lasted a century and a half. In 1789, a European traveler gave a brief description of Agadir: "It is now a ghost town, there are no more than a few houses and these are crumbling into ruins".

In 1881, Sultan Hassan I reopened the harbour to trade in order to supply the expeditions he planned in the south. These expeditions, which were to reassert his authority over the Souss tribes and counter the plans of English and Spanish, were held in 1882 and 1886.

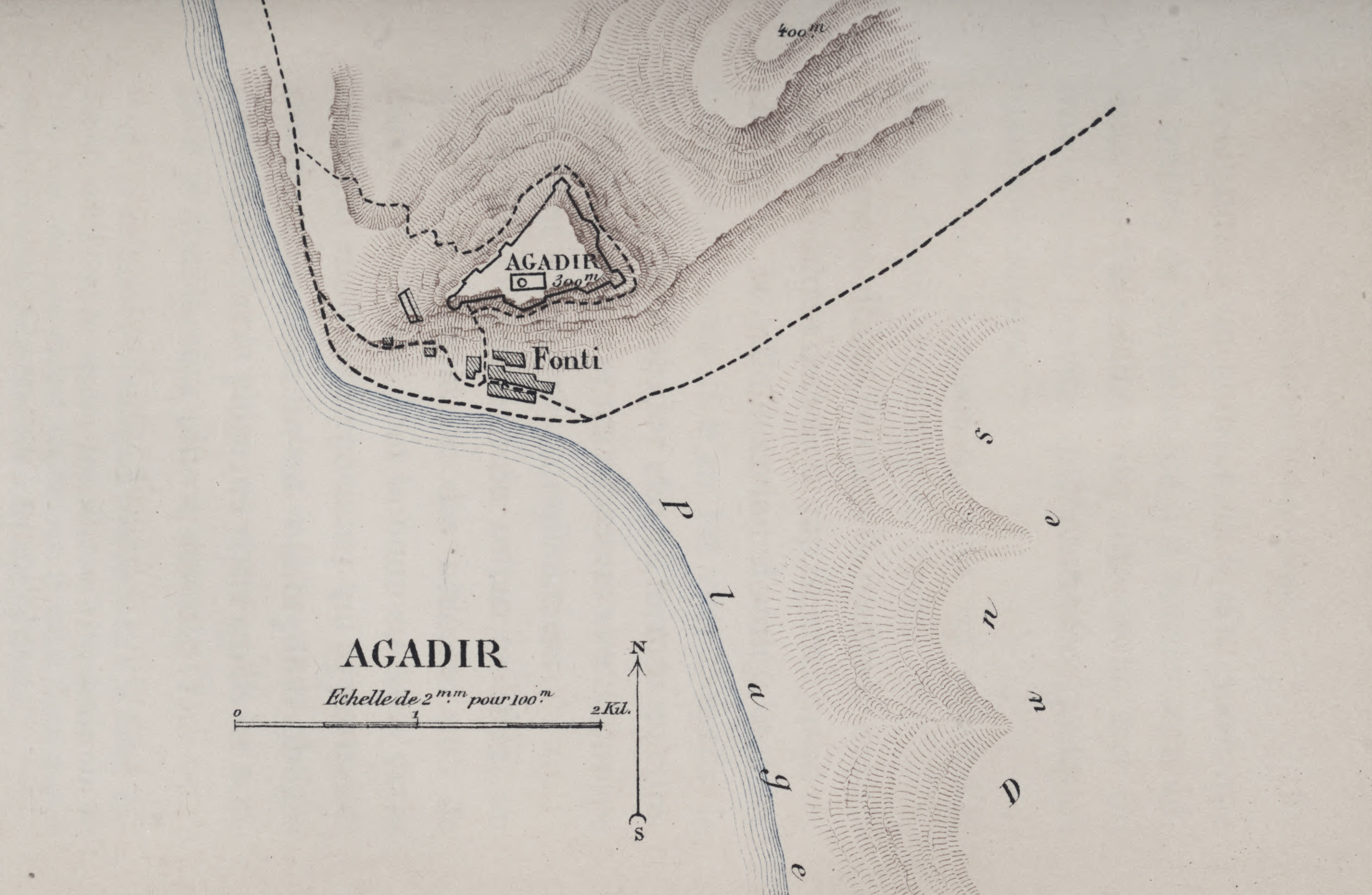
Map of Agadir in 1885 by Jules Erckmann

In 1884, Charles de Foucauld described in Reconnaissance au Maroc (Reconnaissance in Morocco) his rapid passage to Agadir from the east:

I walk along the shore to Agadir Irir. The road passes below the city, half-way between it and Founti: Founti is a miserable hamlet, a few fishermen's huts; Agadir, despite its white enclosure which gives it the air of a city is, I am told, a poor village depopulated and without trade.

On the pretext of a call for help from German companies in the valley of the Souss, Germany decided on 1 July 1911, to extend its interests in Morocco and assert a claim on the country. It sent to the bay of Agadir, (which harbour was, until 1881, closed to foreign trade) the SMS Panther which was quickly joined by the cruiser Berlin. Very strong international reaction, particularly from Great Britain, surprised Germany and triggered the Agadir Crisis between France and Germany. War threatened. After tough negotiations, a Franco-German treaty was finally signed on 4 November 1911, giving a free hand to France, who would be able to establish its protectorate over Morocco in return for giving up some colonies in Africa. It was only then that the gunboat Panther and the cruiser Berlin left the bay of Agadir. Due to a miscalculation, the German sales representative Hermann Wilberg, who was sent to provide the pretext for the intervention, only arrived at Agadir three days after the Panther arrived.

In 1913, the cities (Agadir N'Ighir and Founti) totaled less than a thousand inhabitants. On 15 June 1913 French troops landed in Agadir. In 1916, the first pier was built near Founti – a simple jetty, later known as the "Portuguese jetty", which remained until the end of the 20th century. After 1920, under the French protectorate, a port was built and the city saw its first development with the construction of the old Talborjt district located on the plateau at the foot of the hill. Two years later, beside Talborjt along the faultline of the river Tildi construction of the popular district of Yahchech began.

Around 1930, Agadir was an important stop for the French airmail service Aéropostale and was frequented by Saint-Exupéry and Mermoz.

From 1930 onwards, a modern central city began to be built according to the plans of the urban planner Henri Prost, director of the Urban Planning Department of the Protectorate, and his deputy Albert Laprade: a horseshoe layout based on the waterfront around a large avenue perpendicular to the waterfront – the Avenue Lyautey, since renamed Avenue du Général Kettani. In the 1950s, urban development continued under the direction of the Director of Urban Planning Morocco, Michel Ecochard.

After 1950 and the opening of the new commercial port, the city grew with fishing, canning, agriculture, and mining. It also began to open up to tourism due to its climate and hotel infrastructure. Several years later from 1950 to 1956 Agadir organized the Grand Prix of Agadir and, from 1954 to 1956, the Moroccan Grand Prix.

In 1959, the port was visited by the yacht of the Greek shipping magnate Aristotle Onassis and his guest, Winston Churchill.

By 1960, Agadir numbered over 40,000 residents when at 15 minutes to midnight on 29 February 1960, it was again almost totally destroyed by an earthquake of magnitude 5.7 on the Richter scale that lasted 15 seconds, burying the city and killing more than a third of the population. The death toll was estimated at 15,000. The earthquake destroyed the old Kasbah.

=== Agadir after 1960 ===
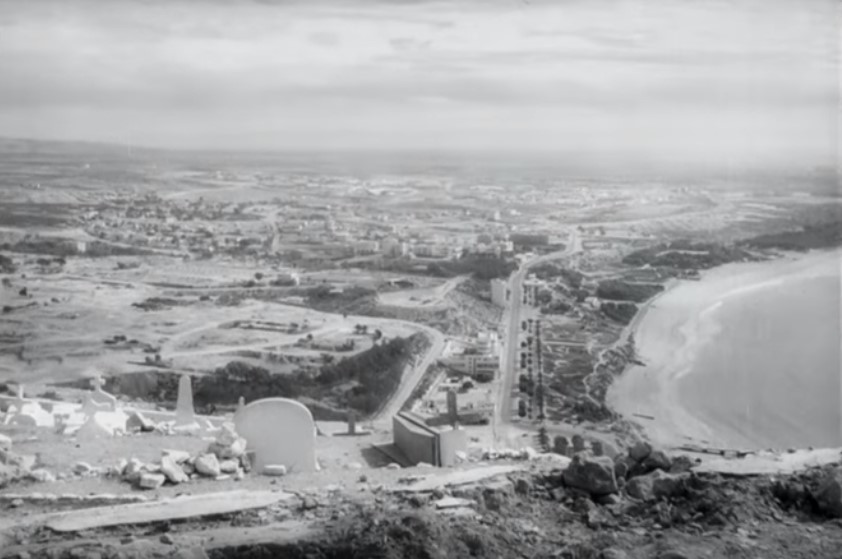
Agadir in 1960, following the earthquake

The current city was rebuilt 1.6 kilometres (1 mi) further south, led by the architects associated with GAMMA, including Jean-François Zevaco, Elie Azagury, Pierre Coldefy, and Claude Verdugo, with consultation from Le Corbusier. Agadir became a large city of over half a million by 2004, with a large port with four basins: the commercial port with a draft of 17 metres, triangle fishing, fishing port, and a pleasure boat port with marina. Agadir was the premier sardine port in the world in the 1980s and has a beach stretching over 10 km with fine seafront promenades. Its climate has 340 days of sunshine per year which allows for swimming all year round. The winter is warm and in summer, haze is common.

With Marrakech, Agadir is a very important centre for tourism to Morocco, and the city is the most important fishing port in the country. Business is also booming with the export of citrus fruit and vegetables produced in the fertile valley of Souss.

On 12 December 2022, an earthquake of magnitude 4.5 hit Agadir Province. The earthquake struck at a depth of three kilometres beneath the epicentre, off the coast of Agadir.

== Geography ==
Panoramic view of the city

=== Urban layout and planning ===
The Commune of Agadir covers an administrative territory of 110 square kilometres, extending from the coastal settlements of Anza and Taddart in the north to Tikiouine in the southeastern municipal perimeter.

==== Post-earthquake reconstruction ====
Following the 1960 earthquake, an autonomous authority, the High Commissariat for Reconstruction, was established on 29 June 1960 by royal decree to enforce safety standards and municipal zoning. Master zoning designated 250 hectares across the unstable pre-Atlas zone as non-constructible, encompassing the Kasbah ridge, Founti, Old Talborjt, and Yachech. The post-1960 urban plan applied an orthogonal grid placing buildings on elevated plateaus, while lower thalwegs and natural depressions were reserved for public parks and recreational spaces.

Agadir was the first Moroccan municipality planned under a comprehensive Master Urban Development Scheme (SDAU) alongside a Local Housing and Urban Development Plan (PLHDU), implementing the principles of the CIAM Charter of Athens. The municipal grid was organized into monofunctional zones (civic administration, international tourism, light and heavy industry, and residential units) divided into six self-contained quarters connected by wide vehicular arteries designed to divert industrial traffic from commercial and leisure zones.

==== Urban Development Programme (2020-2024) ====
The Agadir Urban Development Programme (PDU 2020–2024) allocated 5.991 billion dirhams across 94 projects to upgrade public transit, road networks, municipal greening, and heritage landmarks.

=== Administrative districts ===
The City Hall

==== Residential districts ====
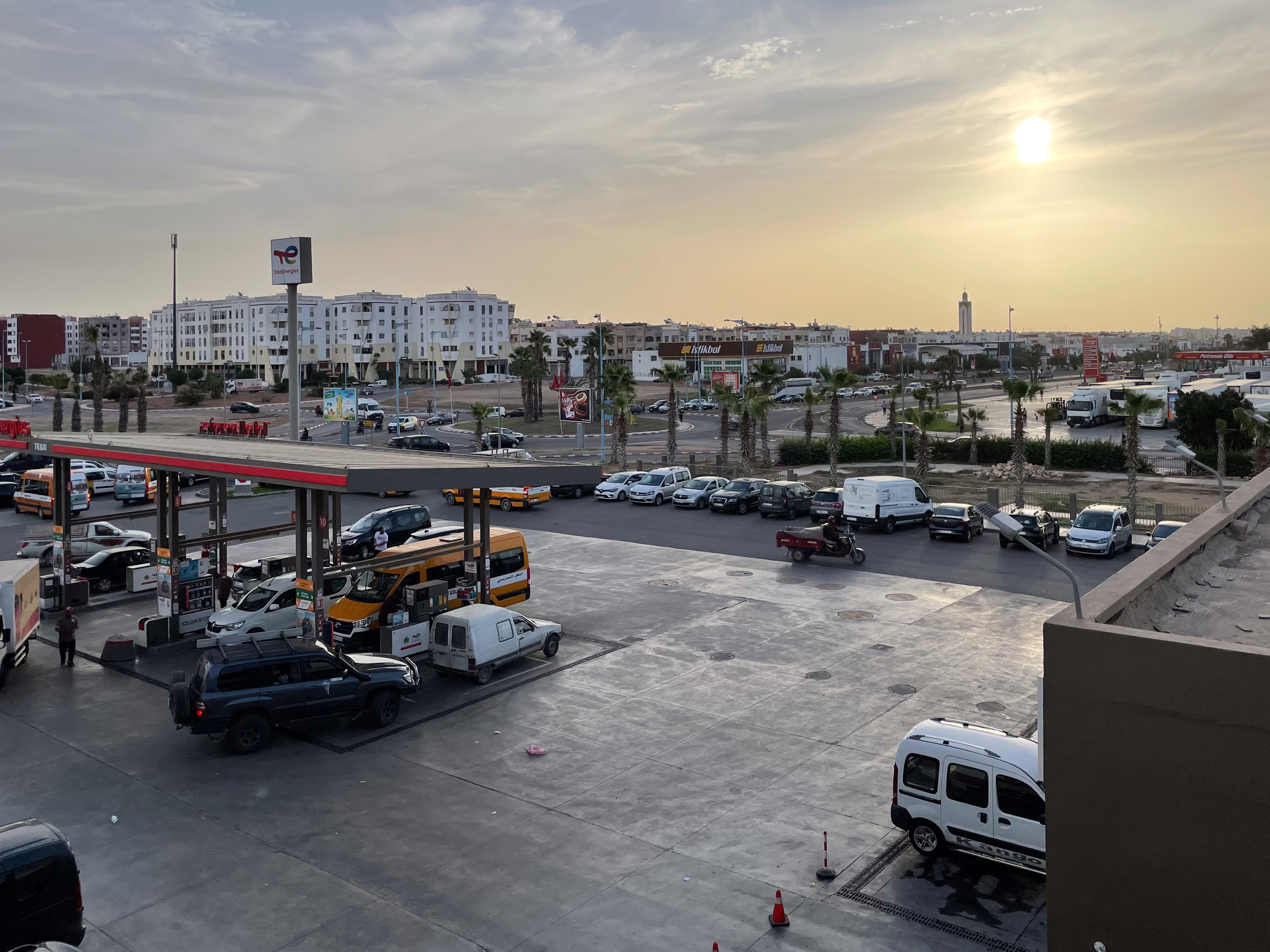
Residential area on the outskirts.

- Swiss Village: the oldest district of villas bordered by the Avenue of FAR (Royal Armed Forces), Avenue Mokhtar Soussi, Cairo Avenue, and the Avenue of the United Nations.
- Mixed Sector District (THE NEW IHCHACH): the French and Spanish Consulates are in this district.
- Founty or "Bay of palm trees": a seaside area with residential villas, large hotels, holiday homes, and the royal palace.
- High Founty: a new district of buildings and residential villas, located in the new city centre between the new Court of Appeal and the Marjane supermarket.
- Illigh: to the east in front of the Hassan II hospital, is a residential area of large villas, housing the "new bourgeoisie".
- Charaf: The Hassan II hospital is in this district.
- Les Amicales: also known as the "city of government employees"
- Dakhla: close to the Ibn Zohr University, it has a mix between modern buildings, ordinary villas, and studio apartments. This new town created in 1979 was the last work before his death of the renowned French urbanist, Gérald Hanning.
- Hay Mohammadi: a new urbanization zone in Agadir with a villa zone and a zone for large groups of buildings to frame the extension of the Avenue des FAR in the northwest.
- Adrar City: a new district next to the Metro hypermarket.
- Other neighbourhoods: Amsernat, Lakhyam, Erac Bouargane, Massira, Essalam, Tilila, Tassila, Bensergao, Riad Assalam, Islane, Ihchach (Yachech) Nahda, Anza, Assaka, Bir Anzarane, Tikouine, Zaitoune, Taddart and El Houda.

=== The Kasbah ===
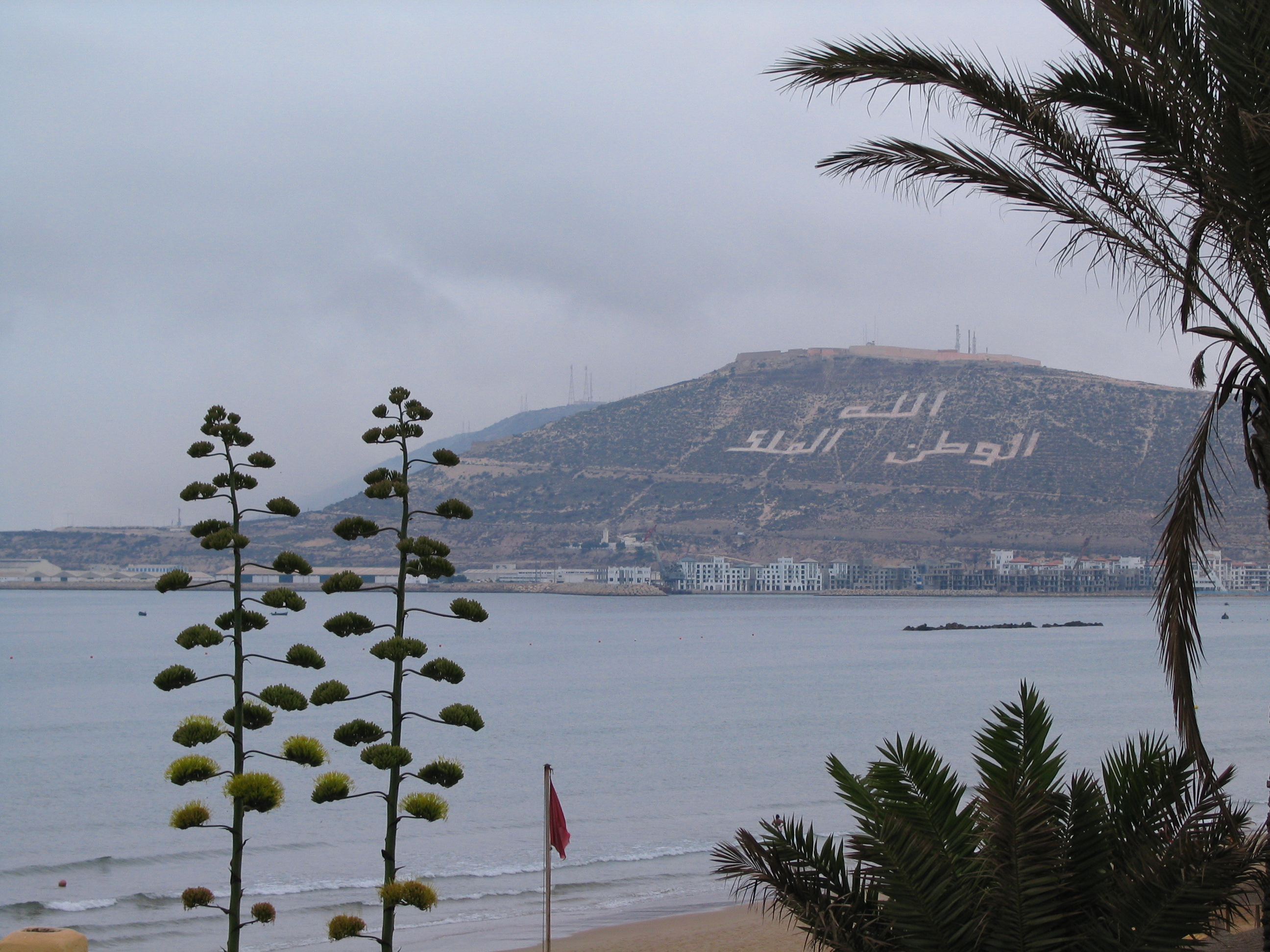
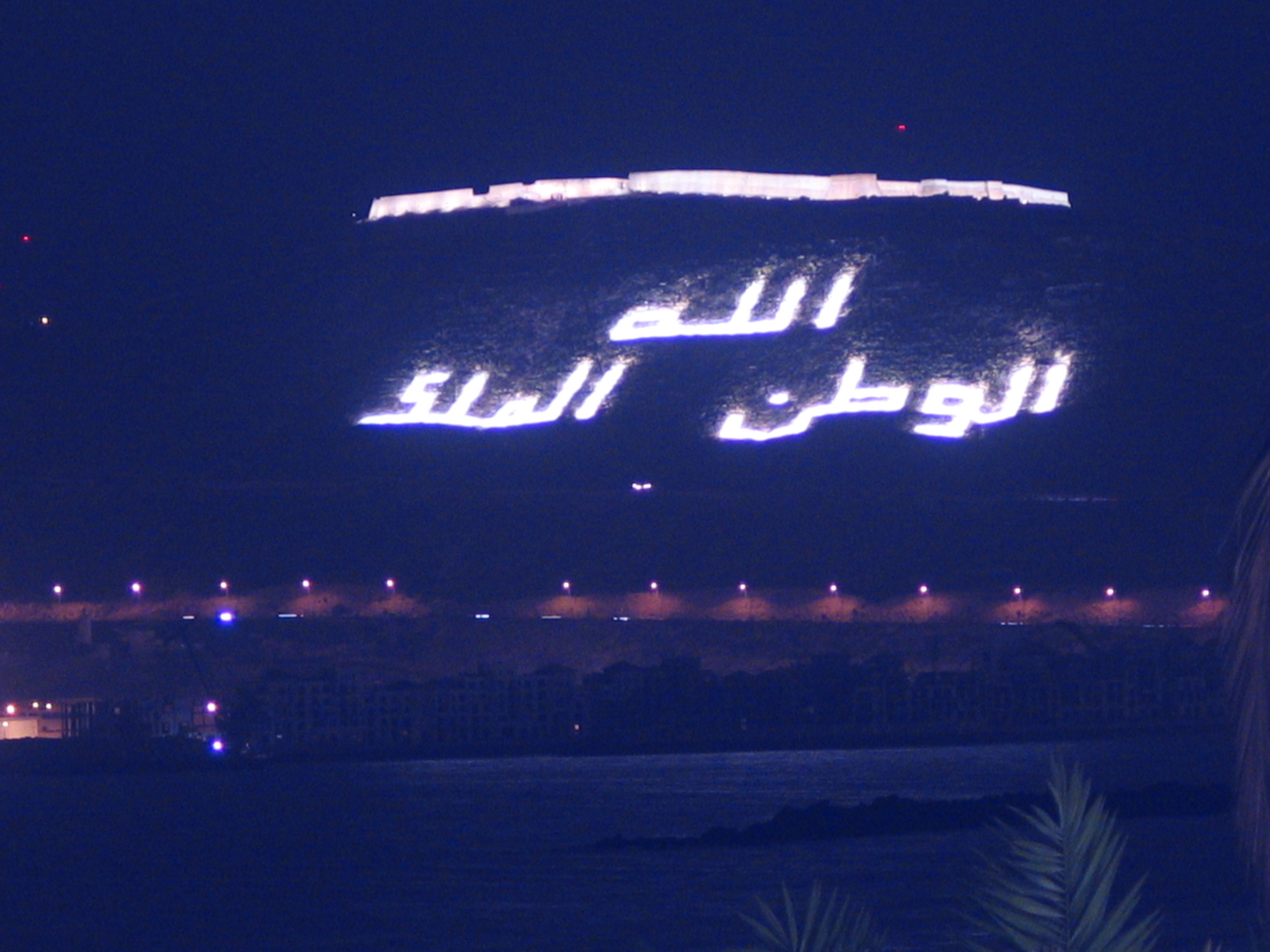
Hill of the old Kasbah of Agadir Oufla at day/night

The Kasbah (Agadir Oufla, Agadir le haut, Agadir N'Ighir, or Agadir de la colline) was, along with Founti by the sea, the oldest district of Agadir. An authentic fortress with winding streets and lively, the Kasbah was built in 1572 by Abdallah al-Ghalib. Above the front door; today, the original inscription in Arabic and in English reads: "God, the Nation, the King."

Of this fortress there remains, after the earthquake of 29 February 1960, a restored long high wall that surrounds land that is not buildable. There is, however, a view over the bay of Agadir and the ports. The old people of Agadir remember the "Moorish café" of the Kasbah and its panoramic view.

The hill bears the inscription in Arabic: "God, Country, King" which, like the walls, is illuminated at night.

==== New Talborjt ====
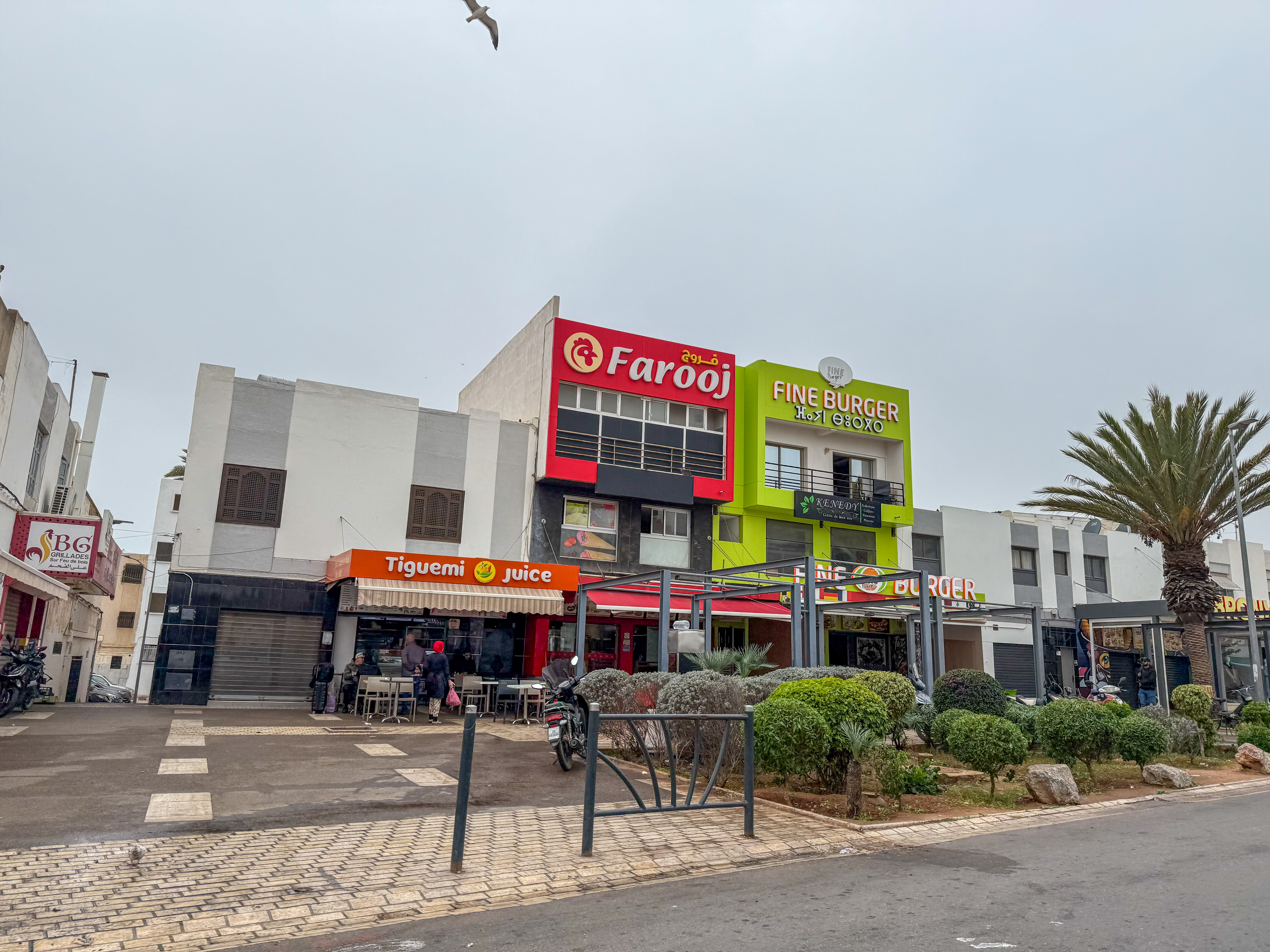
Restaurants in Talborjt.

This area is named after the old district of Talborjt (meaning "small fort" in local Berber, in remembrance of the water tower which was first built on the plateau in the former Talborjt). Lively, the New Talborjt which has been rebuilt away from the Old Talborjt, has as the main artery the Boulevard Mohammed Sheikh Saadi, named after the victor against the Portuguese in 1541. Other major avenues are the Avenue President Kennedy and the Avenue 29 February. There is also the Mohammed V mosque, the Olhão garden (Olhão is a coastal city in southern Portugal that is twinned with Agadir), and its memorial museum and the Garden Ibn Zaydoun. Some good hotels and restaurants have been built on the main arteries.

==== Old Talborjt ====
Overlooking the waterfront and Wadi Tildi, this old district (whose name is sometimes spelled Talbordjt) was once a shopping area and very lively with its large square where there was a weekly market, hotels, schools, mosque. 90% of the buildings in Old Talborjt were destroyed or severely damaged by the earthquake in 1960. Razed to the ground after the earthquake and now overgrown, it is classified as non-buildable area. Its main thoroughfare, the Avenue El Moun stretches over 2 kilometres (1.2 mi) and serves only for driving schools that teach their students to drive.

==== Souk El Had ====
This is the largest market in the region. It has about 6,000 small shops. It is surrounded by walls and has several entrances. It is organized into different sectors: furniture, crafts, clothing, vegetables, meat, spices etc. It is possible to find all kinds of handicrafts and traditional decorations.

The walls have been restored and the interior design is being finished.

==== La Médina ====
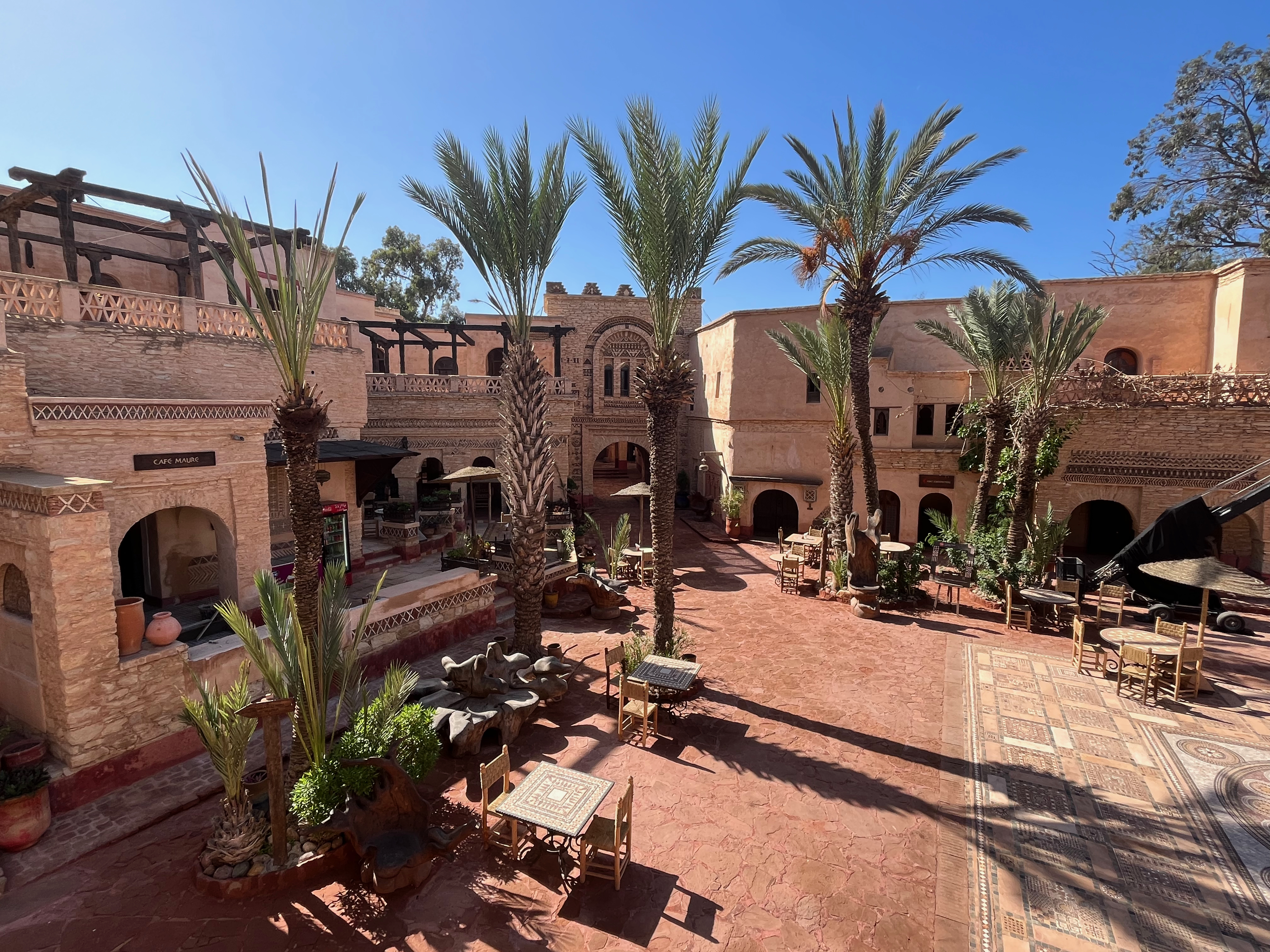
La Médina.

La Médina is a handicrafts space created in 1992 by the Italian artist Coco Polizzi, at Ben Sergao, a district close to Agadir 4.5 kilometres (2.8 mi) from the city centre. Built using techniques of traditional Berber construction, it is a kind of small open-air museum, on five hectares and home to artisan workshops, a museum, individual residences, a small hotel, and an exotic garden.

=== Physical geography ===
Agadir is located at the intersection of the southern High Atlas and the Sous bassin. It occupies the Atlantic coastal plain bounded by the southern foothills of the High Atlas mountain range to the north and the Sous River to the south. The local tectonic framework is defined by the South Atlas flexure system, which divides into secondary fault segments including the Kasbah Fault, the Tildi Fault, and the Lahouar Fault.

=== Climate ===
Ida-Ou Tanane mountains

Agadir has a semi-arid climate (Köppen: BSh) with warm summers and mild winters. Located along the Atlantic Ocean, Agadir has a very mild climate. The daytime temperature generally stays in the 20s °C (70s °F) every day with averages around 27 °C (81 °F), with the winter highs typically reaching 21 °C (70 °F) in January.

Rainfall is almost entirely confined to the winter months and is heavily influenced by the NAO, with negative NAO indices producing wet winters and positive NAO correlating with drought. For instance, in the wettest month on record of December 1963, as much as 314.7 millimetres or 12.39 inches fell, whereas in the positive NAO year from July 1960 to June 1961 a mere 46.7 millimetres or 1.84 inches occurred over the twelve months. The wettest year has been from July 1955 to June 1956 with 455.5 millimetres or 17.93 inches.

Occasionally however, the region experiences winds from the Sahara called Chergui, which may exceptionally and for two to five days raise the heat above 40 °C (104 °F). The confirmed record high temperature was 50.4 °C (122.7 °F) set on 12 August 2023. This makes Agadir one of few coastal locations in the world to have recorded a temperature above 50 °C. The record of 51.7 °C degrees, which was on 19 August 1940, is disputed.

In 1950, a poster from the Navigation Company Pacquet proclaimed: "Winter or summer, I bathe in Agadir".

Climate data for Agadir (Inezgane) (1991–2020)
Month	Jan	Feb	Mar	Apr	May	Jun	Jul	Aug	Sep	Oct	Nov	Dec	Year
Record high °C (°F)	32.0 (89.6)	36.0 (96.8)	38.9 (102.0)	40.0 (104.0)	46.1 (115.0)	48.3 (118.9)	49.3 (120.7)	50.8 (123.4)	45.0 (113.0)	43.3 (109.9)	38.0 (100.4)	33.6 (92.5)	50.8 (123.4)
Mean maximum °C (°F)	25.9 (78.6)	28.2 (82.8)	32.3 (90.1)	33.2 (91.8)	35.6 (96.1)	37.5 (99.5)	42.1 (107.8)	42.1 (107.8)	38.2 (100.8)	34.9 (94.8)	30.8 (87.4)	26.2 (79.2)	44.12 (111.42)
Mean daily maximum °C (°F)	21.2 (70.2)	22.0 (71.6)	23.4 (74.1)	23.2 (73.8)	24.2 (75.6)	25.6 (78.1)	26.7 (80.1)	27.0 (80.6)	26.1 (79.0)	26.1 (79.0)	24.1 (75.4)	22.1 (71.8)	24.3 (75.8)
Daily mean °C (°F)	14.8 (58.6)	16.1 (61.0)	17.9 (64.2)	18.7 (65.7)	20.1 (68.2)	21.9 (71.4)	23.0 (73.4)	23.3 (73.9)	22.3 (72.1)	21.4 (70.5)	18.5 (65.3)	16.1 (61.0)	19.5 (67.1)
Mean daily minimum °C (°F)	8.4 (47.1)	10.1 (50.2)	12.3 (54.1)	14.1 (57.4)	15.9 (60.6)	18.1 (64.6)	19.2 (66.6)	19.5 (67.1)	18.6 (65.5)	16.7 (62.1)	12.9 (55.2)	10.1 (50.2)	14.7 (58.4)
Mean minimum °C (°F)	5.3 (41.5)	6.4 (43.5)	8.0 (46.4)	9.8 (49.6)	11.4 (52.5)	14.3 (57.7)	16.1 (61.0)	16.8 (62.2)	15.4 (59.7)	12.8 (55.0)	8.7 (47.7)	6.6 (43.9)	4.76 (40.57)
Record low °C (°F)	1.1 (34.0)	2.4 (36.3)	5.2 (41.4)	4.4 (39.9)	8.4 (47.1)	12.7 (54.9)	13.0 (55.4)	14.2 (57.6)	12.1 (53.8)	9.5 (49.1)	1.6 (34.9)	2.2 (36.0)	1.1 (34.0)
Average precipitation mm (inches)	32.0 (1.26)	28.6 (1.13)	31.3 (1.23)	13.8 (0.54)	5.6 (0.22)	0.8 (0.03)	0.2 (0.01)	3.1 (0.12)	3.7 (0.15)	21.2 (0.83)	42.3 (1.67)	49.0 (1.93)	231.6 (9.12)
Average precipitation days (≥ 1 mm)	2.8	2.7	3.2	1.7	0.8	0.2	0.1	0.3	0.5	1.9	3.0	3.6	20.8
Average relative humidity (%)	67.3	66.4	68.2	71.6	75.1	78.8	81.9	82.5	79.4	73.1	69.2	67.8	73.4
Average dew point °C (°F)	9.1 (48.4)	9.5 (49.1)	10.3 (50.5)	11.5 (52.7)	13.1 (55.6)	15.6 (60.1)	17.8 (64.0)	18.2 (64.8)	17.0 (62.6)	14.8 (58.6)	11.6 (52.9)	9.7 (49.5)	13.2 (55.7)
Mean monthly sunshine hours	234.6	224.8	266.8	273.5	297.1	266.8	252.7	247.6	234.5	242.2	228.1	221.8	2,990.5
Percentage possible sunshine	74	73	73	71	71	64	59	61	64	70	73	71	68
Average ultraviolet index	5.2	6.7	8.4	9.8	11.1	11.7	12.0	11.8	10.7	9.1	6.4	5.1	9.0
Source: National Oceanic and Atmospheric Administration (NOAA) — Climate Normals; — Historical Normals — Temperature Extremes — Climate Overview — Weather Averages — Airport Climate — Climate Analysis — Historical Weather — Historical Climate — Modelled Climate — Climate Statistics.

== Demographics ==
Languages spoken in the Agadir commune (2024 census)
Native languages	Percent
Arabic	58.3%
Berber languages	40.7%
Other	1.0%

The commune of Agadir recorded a population of 501,797 in the 2024 Moroccan census. About 22.9% of the population are under 15 years old, and 13.4% are over 60. Linguistically, a majority of 58.3% the population of the commune of Agadir speak Arabic as their native language, while a sizable minority of 40.7% natively speak Berber languages.

== Economy ==
The Greater Agadir region is the center of Souss-Massa's economy, which generates approximately 6.7% to 7% of Morocco's GDP, with a regional value added of over 70.1 billion dirhams. The prefecture of Agadir Ida-Outanane exhibits a concentration of income that exceeds both the regional and national averages, registering a GDP per capita of 38,427 dirhams in 2018, while the averages for Souss-Massa and the entire country in 2018 stood at 26,328 dirhams and 31,473 dirhams respectively. The prefecture of Agadir Ida-Outanane and Taroudant both account for 65% of the total regional economic activity.

According to the World Bank's subnational surveys, administrative processes in Agadir are highly efficient, as obtaining a building permit takes an average of 93 days (compared to 157 days in the OECD) and starting a business takes 9 days (compared to 13 days in the OECD).

=== Tourism ===
Agadir's cable car system seen from Agadir Oufla in July 2022

Agadir is Morocco's second-largest tourist center (second to Marrakesh). It accounts for 78% of Souss-Massa's total hotel capacity of 39,400 and welcomes over 1.24 million tourists annually, contributing to the more than 6.5 billion dirhams in hotel turnover generated in the region. The Taghazout Bay ecotourism resort, developed across 615 hectares north of the city, represents over 10 billion dirhams in investment with a planned final capacity of 12,316 beds. Agadir–Al Massira International Airport is the second-busiest tourist airport in Morocco. It surpassed the milestone of 3 million annual passengers in 2024, and planned expansion projects aim to raise capacity for 7 million travelers.

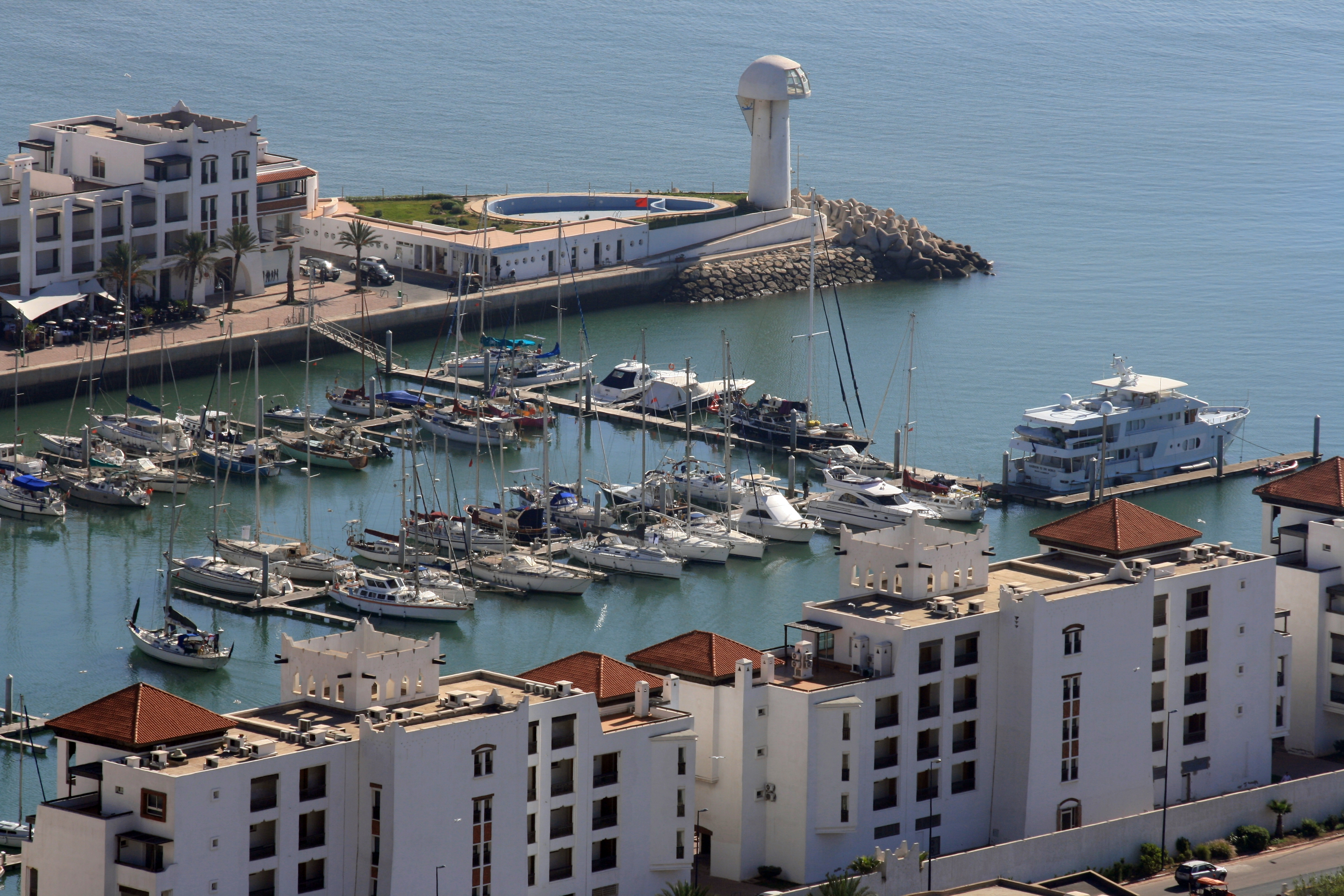
Agadir Marina

Agadir is the first and only city in Morocco to have its own urban tourist cable car network, the Agadir tourist cable car. Between 800,000 and 1 million visitors were expected for its first operating year, and an extension to the Danialand leisure park is planned.

Main source markets for tourism in Agadir
Source country	Annual tourists in 2019
Morocco	468,000
France	219,000
Germany	130,000
United Kingdom	122,000

=== Agriculture ===
Agadir serves as the logistic and commercial hub for Souss-Massa, which is Morocco's primary fruit and vegetable export region and represents 9% of national agricultural GDP. The immediate agricultural hinterland of the Chtouka plain, tighly integrated with Agadir's agribusiness units and port yields 1.3 million tonnes of vegetable crops and accounts for 86% of Morocco's early produce exports. The regional agrifood sector generates 14 billion dirhams in annual turnover, supported by the Souss-Massa Agropole industrial park which is a 75 hectare industrial, logistical and service site located near Agadir.

=== Commerce ===
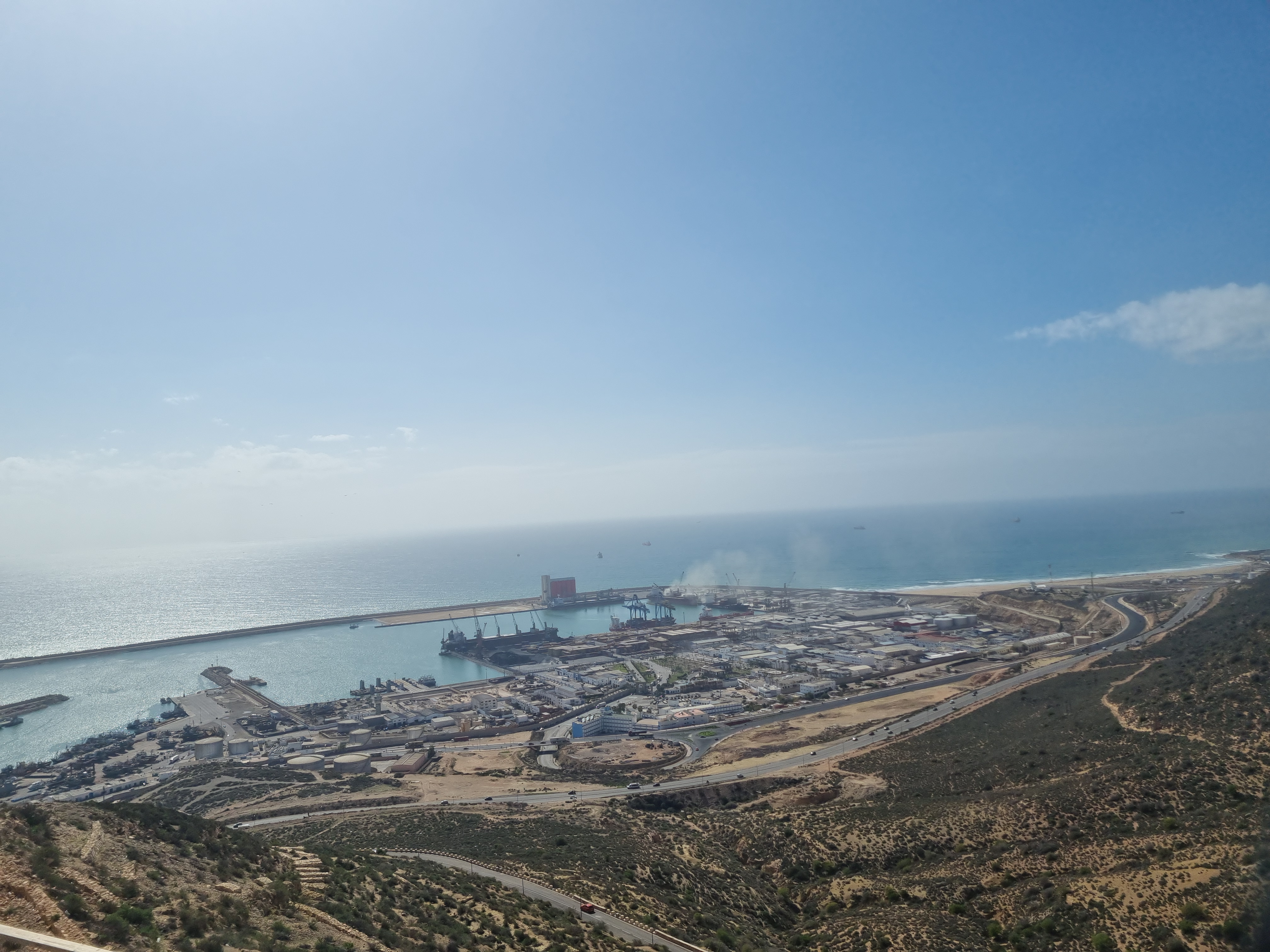
The commercial port of Agadir.

The commercial port of Agadir handles a total cargo traffic of 7.5 million tonnes by the end of 2025. It includes 1,344 linear meters of quays with depths reaching up to 15 meters and handles an annual containerized traffic volume exceeding 150,000 TEUs. Logistical capacity in Agadir's periphery (Greater Agadir) is being strengthened by the development of a 100-hectare dry port in the municipality of Drarga, through an investment of 1.4 billion dirhams. Agadir also has the biggest urban market in Africa; Souk El Had. It spans more than 13 hectares with 13 gates and houses around 3,000 retail shops.

=== Fishing ===
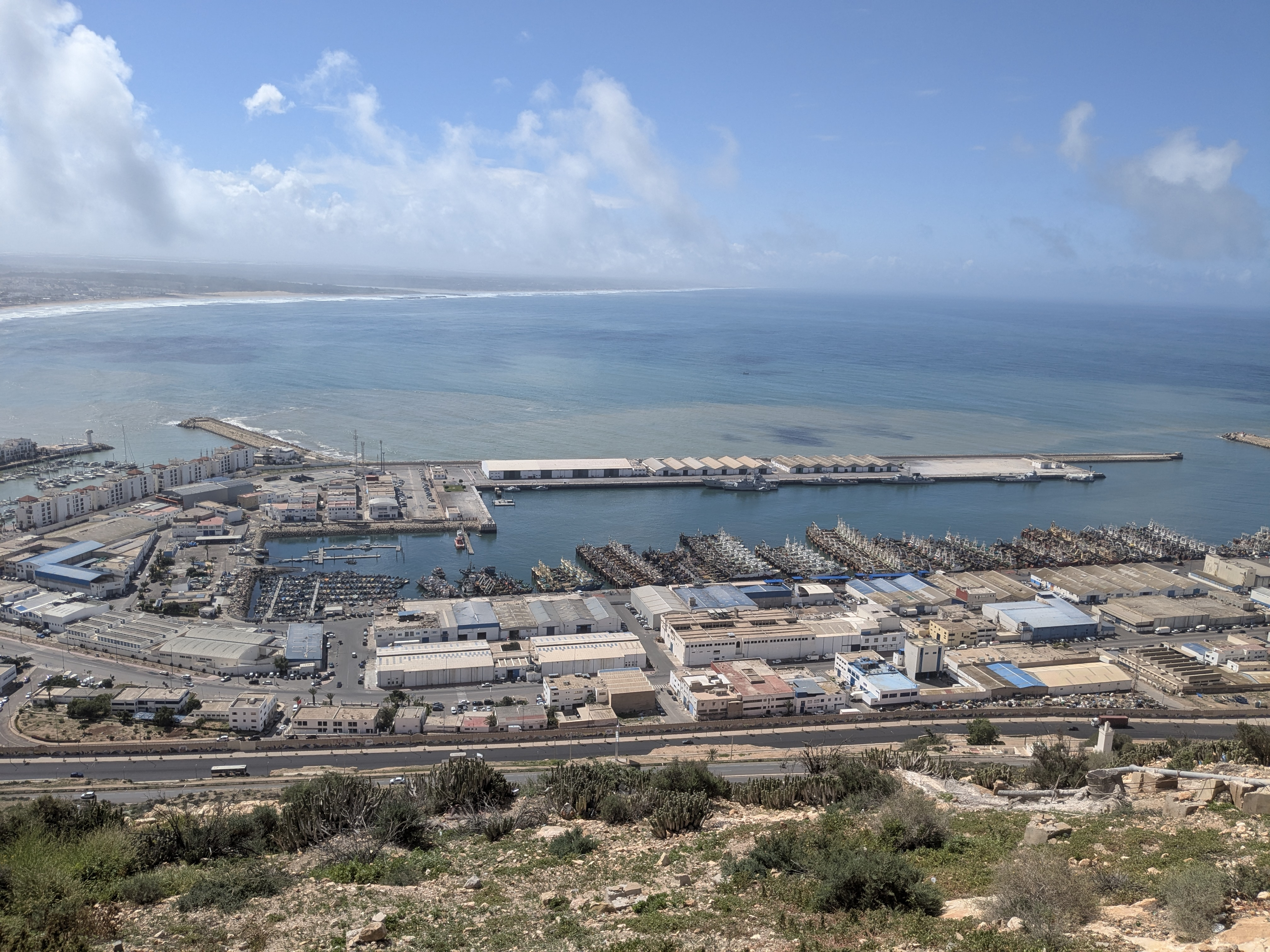
The fishing port seen from Agadir Oufla.

Agadir is Morocco's leading seafood processing hub. It accounts for 30% of national fishing GDP and 50% of the country's canned fish exports through 83 processing plants employing 14,000 people. The port of Agadir serves as the home port for more than 60% of Morocco's high-seas fishing fleet, and records coastal and artisanal fishing landings ranging between 30,000 and 37,000 tonnes annually. The fishing port is a major sardine port. The commercial port is also known for its exports of cobalt, manganese, zinc and citrus products. The Avenue du Port, the main artery of the Anza district, is surrounded by canneries and has many popular small restaurants adjacent to the fish market.

=== Industry ===
Regional industrial policy is structured around the Souss-Massa Industrial Acceleration Plan (PAI, French: Plan d'Accélération Industriel), which targets the creation of 24,000 direct industrial jobs supported by a private investment fund (FDIS, French: Fond d'Investissement et de Développement Souss-Massa) endowed with 500 million dirhams. The Drarga Industrial Acceleration Zone (ZAI, French: Zone d'Accélération Industrielle) provides 305 to 350 hectares of serviced industrial land under free-zone status, hosting major export-oriented industrial groups such as Leoni, which opened a factory in 2025, and Meditech Gloves.

Agadir established Morocco's first City of Trades and Skills (CMC) across 15 hectares in Drarga to meet workforce training requirements for industry and services. It offers capacity for 3,000 trainees annually and required an investment of 430 million dirhams.

The city has a cement company called Ciments du Maroc (CIMAR), a subsidiary of the Italian group Italcementi which is in process of being transferred to a new plant 40 kilometres (25 mi) from the city. There is also a shipyard in the port and the only merchant marine school in Morocco.

== Infrastructure ==
=== Road ===
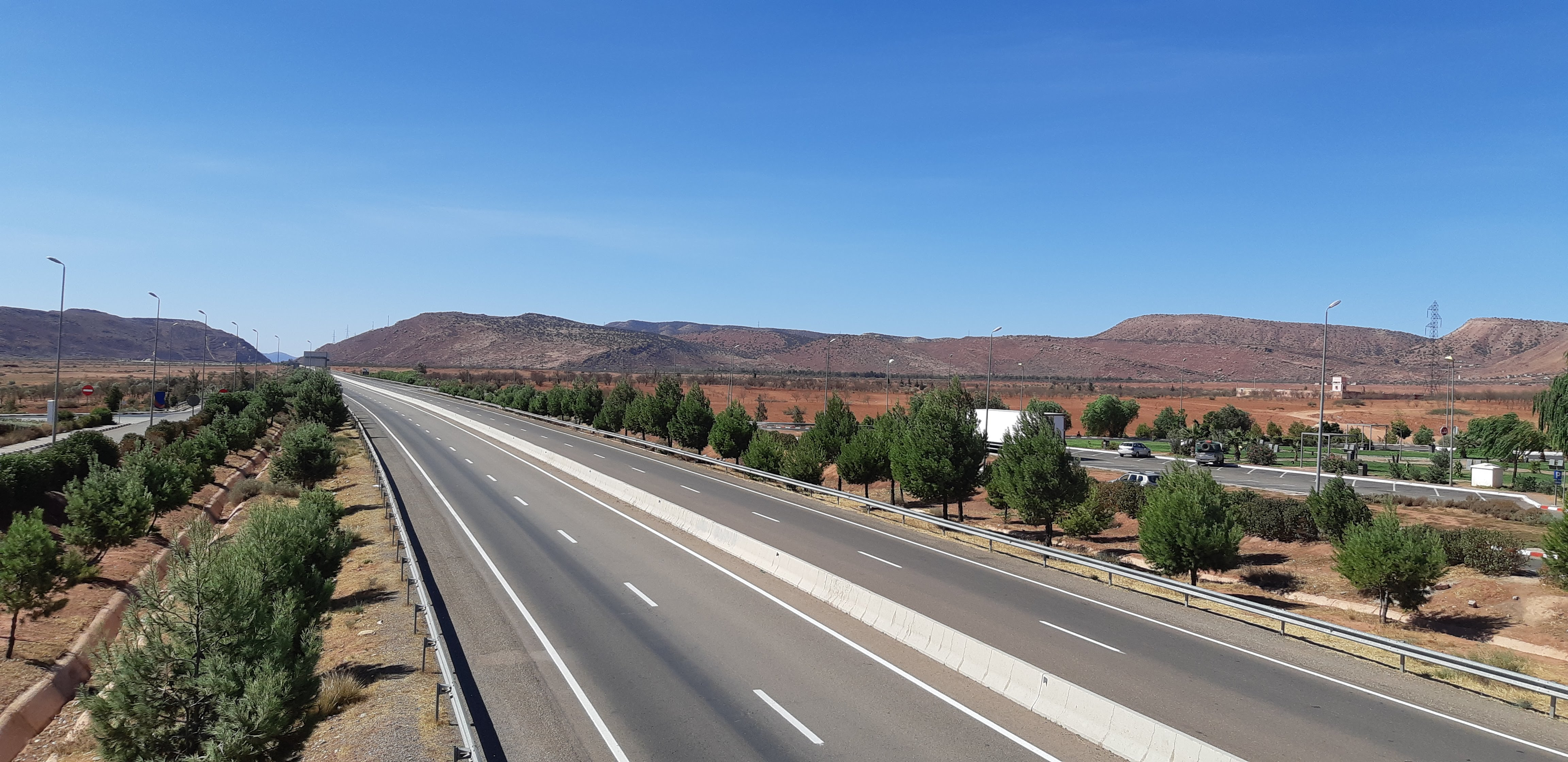
Marrakech-Agadir Highway

Agadir is linked to the Casablanca–Agadir expressway (A3 Highway) since 2010.

=== Train ===
As of 2026, Agadir has no railway connection to the rest of Morocco. A high-speed rail line project from Marrakesh to Agadir launched in 2019 is currently in the land acquisition phase, after preliminary studies ended in May 2025, with an executive decree officially recognizing it as being in the public interest, allowing land expropriation. A decree published in March 2020 also allowed terrain expropriation for the construction of the future Agadir railway station in the Hay Mohammadi district. The project was initially planned to link the city by high-speed train in time for the 2030 FIFA World Cup, but no official timeline or scheduled opening date was announced by the Moroccan government.

=== City buses ===
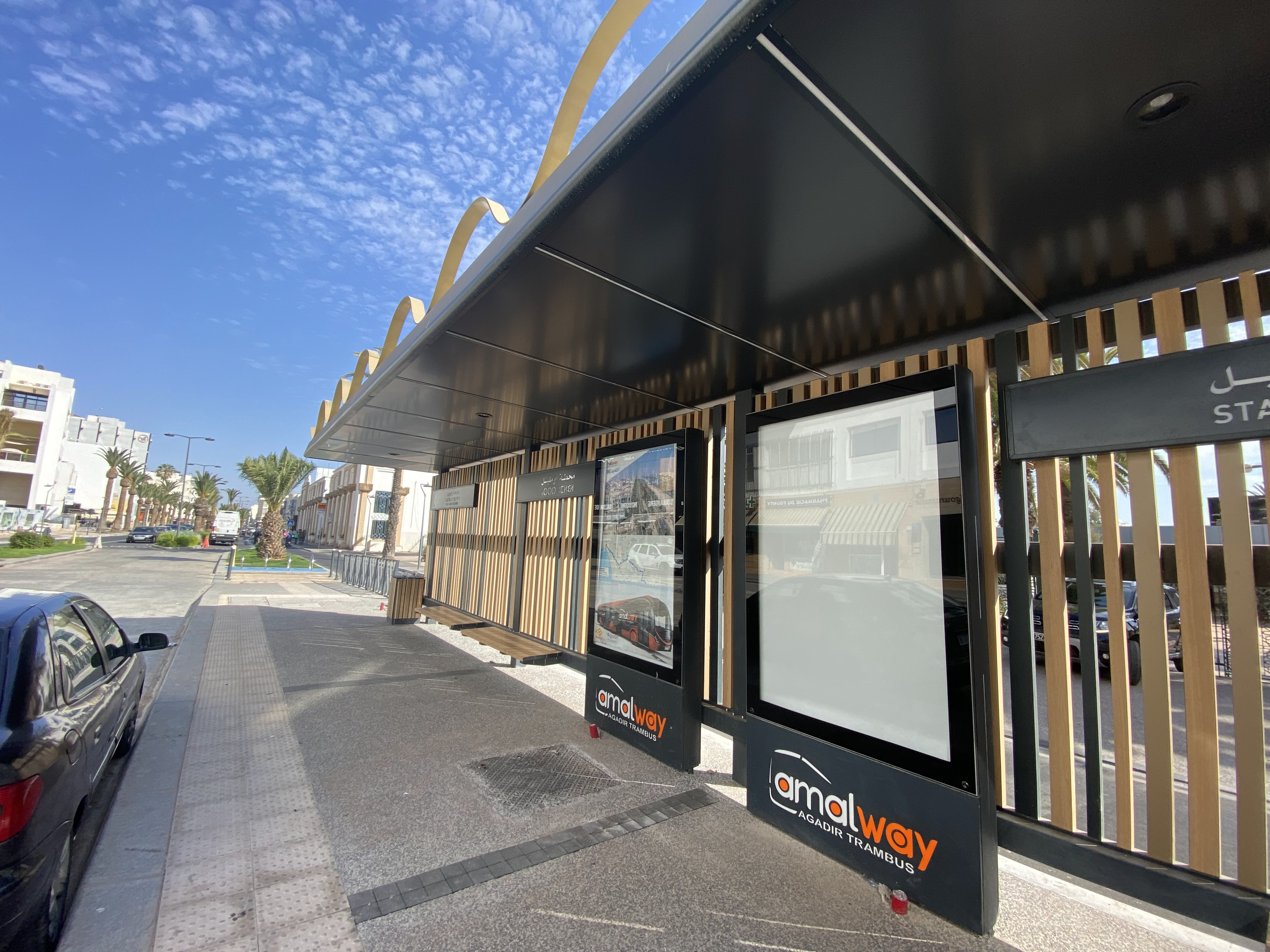
BRT Station in agadir

Agadir launched its first Bus Rapid Transit (BRT) line, named "Amalway Trambus", in 2026. It runs through Agadir across 15.5 kilometers with 35 stations between the port and Tikiouine to restructure metropolitan mobility. A second and third line are planned.

=== Air ===
Agadir is served by Al Massira Airport, in Temsia 23 kilometres (14 mi) from the city. Inezgane Airport now serves exclusively as military air base.

=== Cable car ===
Agadir is the first and only city in Morocco to have its own urban cable car line, the Agadir tourist cable car, which opened in October 2022. It connects the Tildi bridge to the Agadir Oufla over a length of 1,700 meters. It was expected to welcome between 800,000 and 1 million visitors in its first operating year. An extension to the Dania Land leisure development is planned.

== Culture ==
Concert stage for Timitar festival

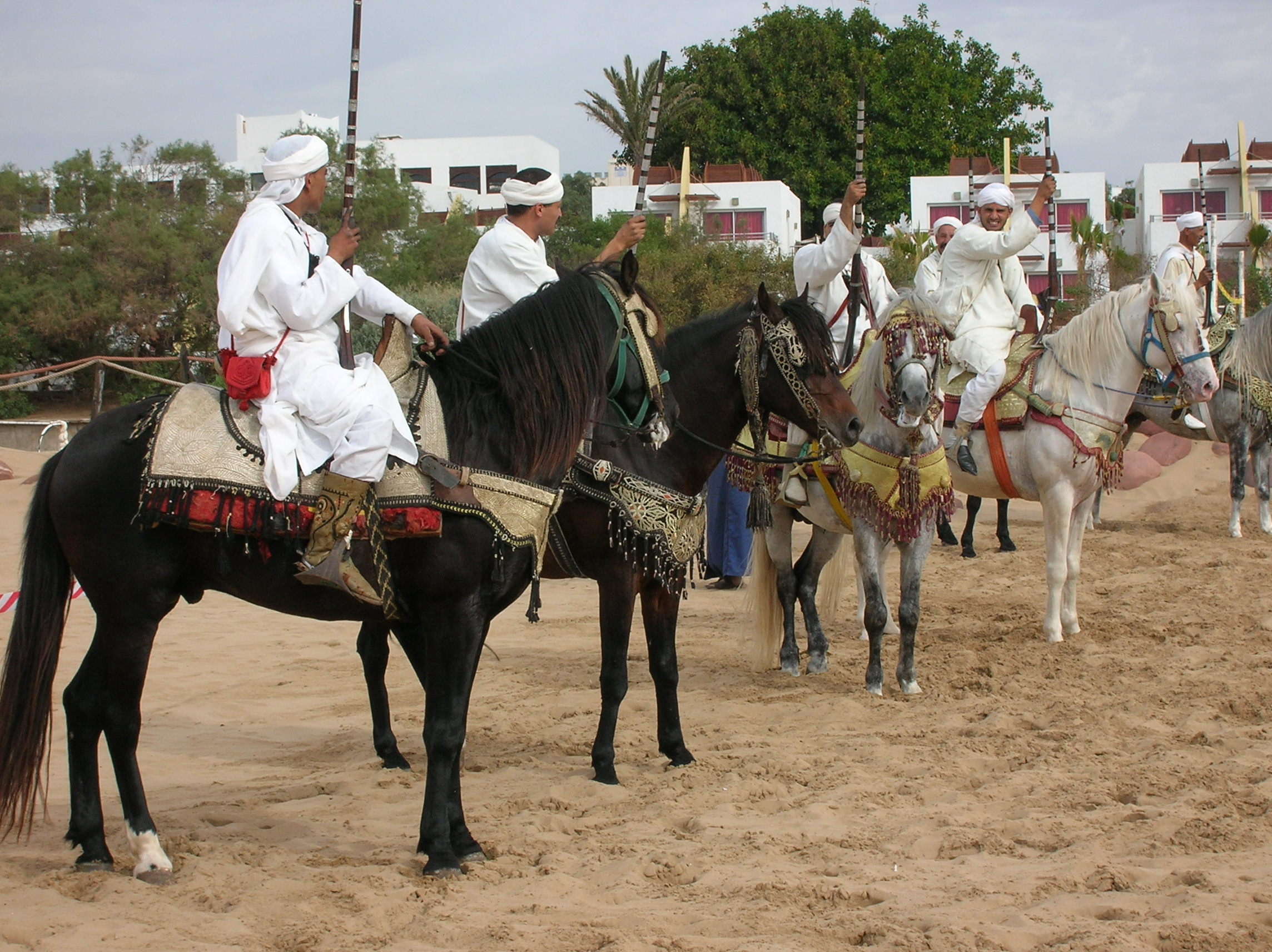
Berber competitors preparing for a Fantasia show in Agadir

The Timitar festival, a festival of Amazigh culture and music from around the world, has been held in Agadir every summer since its inception in July 2004.

The Morocco Movement association is involved in the arts and organizes concerts, exhibitions and meetings in the visual arts, design, music, graphic design, photography, environment and health.

Other cultural events in Agadir are:

- Noiz Makerz concert of urban music.
- Biyelmawn International Carnaval
- Breaking South national break-dancing championship
- International Documentary Film Festival in November (FIDADOC)
- Film Festival for immigration
- International Festival of University Theatre of Agadir
- Concert for Tolerance (November)
- Festival of Laughter
- International Salon of Art of Photography (Clubphoto d'Agadir)

=== Museums ===
Agadir Museum of Art

- Agadir Reconstruction Museum
- Agadir Museum of Art
- Musée de Talborjt "La Casbah"
- Le Musée des Arts Berberes
- Musee Municipal de Agadir
- La Medina d'Agadir

== Education ==
ENSA Agadir

ENCG Agadir

Faculty of Medicine and Pharmacy

The city of Agadir has a university: the University Ibn Zohr which includes a Faculty of Science, Faculty of medicine and pharmacy, Faculty of Law, Economics and Social Sciences, the Faculty of Arts and Humanities, and the multi-disciplined Faculty of Ouarzazate.

There are also establishments of higher education such as:

- the National School of Applied Sciences (ENSA)
- the National School of Business and Management (ENCG)
- the Graduate School of Agadir technology (ESTA).

There is an international French school: the French School of Agadir and also public schools: Youssef Ben Tachfine School, Mohammed Reda-Slaoui School, and the Al-Idrissi Technical College.

High schools in the city include:

- Groupe Scolaire Paul Gauguin Agadir (CLOSED in 2014)
- Groupe Scolaire LE DEFI
- Lycée Lala Meryem Agadir
- Lycée Qualifiant Youssef Ben Tachfine
- Lycée Technique Al Idrissi
- Lycée Al Qalam
- Lycée Al Hanane
- Lycée Français d'Agadir
- Lycée Anoual
- Lycée Zerktouni
- Lycée Mohamed Derfoufi
- Lycée Bader Elouefaq
- Lycée Ibn Maja
- Lycée Mounib
- Lycée Al Inbiaat

== Sports ==
Al Inbiâate Stadium

The city of Agadir's biggest football club is Hassania Agadir and the main stadium is Adrar Stadium, in which the team plays its home matches at. It is slated to host matches in the 2030 FIFA World Cup.

The Hassan II Golf Trophy and Lalla Meryem Cup golf tournaments of the European Tour and Ladies European Tour are held at the Golf du Palais Royal in Agadir since 2011.

The city also hosts the Royal Tennis Club of Agadir.

=== Football ===
- Hassania Agadir

=== Taekwondo ===
- Association club El johara
- Association club central

=== Other sports ===
- Royal Tennis Club Agadir
- Najah Souss Agadir
- Cité Suisse Basket
- Agadir Surf Academy
- Water Skiing Club Agadir

== People ==
- Mohamed Bensaid Ait Idder, Moroccan politician and activist
- Sion Assidon, Moroccan activist
- Walid Azaro, Moroccan footballer
- Abdelkrim Baadi, Moroccan footballer
- Soufiane El Khalidy, Moroccan actor, writer and filmmaker, was born in Agadir
- Jacques Bensimon, Canadian filmmaker, was born in Agadir
- Issam Chebake, Moroccan footballer
- Mohamed Choua, Basketball player
- Jalal Daoudi, Moroccan footballer
- Karim El Berkaoui, Moroccan footballer
- Hicham El Majhad, Moroccan footballer
- Omar Hilale, permanent ambassador of Morocco to the United Nations
- Pokimane, Moroccan-Canadian Internet personality and streamer
- Saadia Himi, Miss Netherlands Earth 2004, born in the Netherlands, has roots in Agadir.
- Hassan Kachloul, former Morocco national football team player, most notably playing for Southampton, Aston Villa and Wolves
- Mohammed Khaïr-Eddine (1941–1995), Moroccan writer
- Dominique Strauss-Kahn, spent his childhood there from 1951 to 1960
- Michel Vieuchange, French adventurer and explorer, died in Agadir in 1930
- Moncef Slaoui, Moroccan-Belgian doctor and researcher.

== Nearby beaches ==
Taghazout beach

Some of the most popular beaches in Morocco are located to the north of Agadir. Areas known for surfing are located near Taghazout village to Cap Ghir.

Many smaller and clean beaches are located along this coast. Some of them between Agadir and Essaouira are: Agadir Beach, Tamaounza (12 km), Aitswal Beach, Imouran (17 km), Taghazout (19 km), Bouyirdn (20 km), Timzguida (22 km), Aghroud (30 km), Imiouadar (27 km).

== Main sights ==
- Agadir Crocodile park
- The view of the city and the bay from Agadir Oufla (Casbah)
- Valley of the Birds, a pleasant bird park stretching along the Avenue of Administrations, between Boulevard Hassan II and 20 August
- The garden of Ibn Zaidoun
- Mohammed V Mosque, on the Boulevard President Kennedy
- Souk el Had (The biggest Market in Africa )
- Amazigh (Berber) Heritage Museum at the Ayt Souss Square
- The garden of Olhão or "Garden of Portugal" and its memorial museum in Talborjt
- The marina with its Moorish architecture and shops
- Loubnane Mosque
- Wall of commemoration
- Memory of Agadir Museum; mostly photographic exhibits which concentrate on the Agadir earthquake on 29 February 1960
- Dephinarium Agadir Dolphin World Morocco

=== Nearby attractions ===
- The city of Taroudant 80 km to the east, along the Souss valley
- Palm Oasis of Tiout 20 km to the east of Taroudant and 100 km from Agadir
- Imouzzer Ida Ou Tanane a small town 60 km northeast of Agadir where Paradise Valley is located
- The beaches of Taghazout and Tamraght. Taghazout-Argana Bay, a large tourism development, was launched in 2007
- The city of Tiznit 90 km to the south and Tafraout 80 km from Tiznit, a magnificent site of pink granite rocks
- The Souss-Massa National Park and Oued Massa, about 70 km to the south and the fishing village of Tifnit
- Legzira beach with spectacular natural arches, 150 km south of Agadir
- Sidi Ifni, 160 km south of Agadir on the coast
- The city of Essaouira 175 km north of Agadir on the coast

== Movies filmed in Agadir ==
- 1934: Le Grand Jeu by Jacques Feyder
- 1954–1955: Oasis by Yves Allégret
- 1969: Du soleil plein les yeux by Michel Boisrond
- 1988: Y'a bon les blancs by Marco Ferreri
- 2006: Days of Glory by Rachid Bouchareb
- 2009: "Les Filles du désert" by Hubert Besson, an episode of the television series Plus belle la vie
- 2011: Agadir Bombay by Myriam Bakir

== In literature and art ==
- Agadir: literary work by Moroccan writer Mohammed Khaïr-Eddine
- Ride to Agadir: song by Mike Batt, that also has a cover by Boney M.

== Sister cities ==
Agadir has nine sister cities

- Mar del Plata, Argentina
- Miami, United States
- Oakland, United States
- Portsmouth, New Hampshire, United States
- Olhão, Portugal
- Nantes, France
- Stavanger, Norway
- Shiraz, Iran
- Vigan, Philippines

Cooperation Pact:

- Lyon, France
