= French College in Agadir =

- الثانویة الفرنسیة باکادیر ⴰⵙⵉⵏⴰⵏ ⴰⴼⵔⴰⵏⵙⵉⵙ ⵖ ⴰⴳⴰⴷⵉⵔ
- Agadir; Morocco

Information
- School type: International School
- Age: 3 to 18
- Language: French

Lycée Français International d'Agadir (LFIA, Arabic: الثانویة الفرنسیة باکادیر, Tifinagh: ⴰⵙⵉⵏⴰⵏ ⴰⴼⵔⴰⵏⵙⵉⵙ ⵖ ⴰⴳⴰⴷⵉⵔ) is a French international school located in the Quartier Sonaba in Agadir, Morocco. It serves maternelle (preschool) until lycée (senior high school).

On 31 August 2014 the Groupe scolaire Paul Gauguin closed, and students were moved to the LFA.
