= Izenzaren =

Amazigh music band

Izenzaren ⵉⵥⵏⵥⴰⵕⵏ
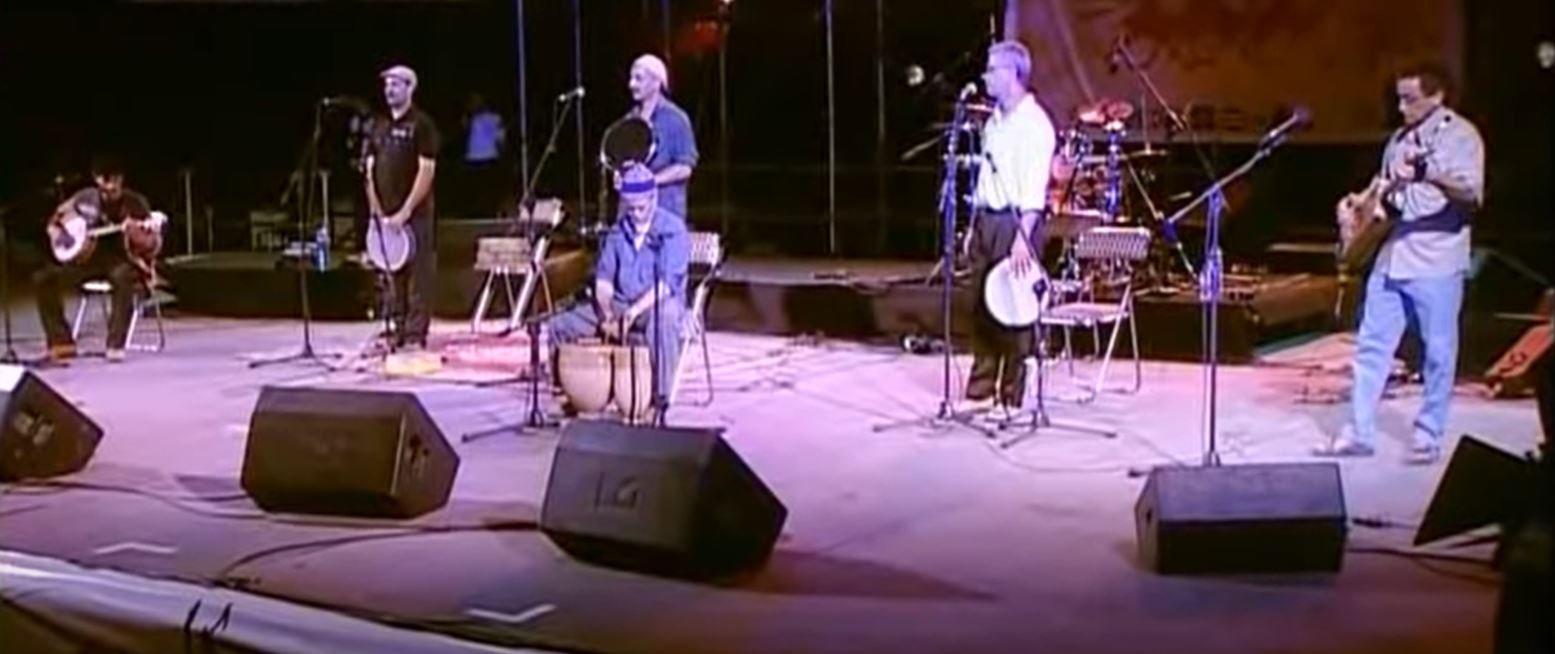
- Izenzaren during the 2009 Guelmim festival

Background information
- Origin: Agadir, Morocco
- Genres: Amazigh music; Soussi Amazigh
- Years active: 1972–present
- Members: Abdelhadi Iggout; Mustapha Chater; Moulay Brahim Talbi; Mohamed Hanafi; Hassan Biri
- Past members: Abdelaziz Chamkh; Lahcen Boufertel

Izenzaren (Berber languages: ⵉⵥⵏⵥⴰⵕⵏ; Romanized: Izenẓaren) is a Moroccan musical group playing music It was formed in 1972 in Agadir, in the Sous region of Morocco by Abdelhadi Iggout and Abdelaziz Chamkh.

== History ==
In the post-colonial Morocco, rural migration became a noticeable phenomenon and created problems for the families newly settling in towns. They were in fact confronted at the same time with the violent process of integration and assimilation as well as with several social and economic problems. This situation required the invention of new forms of poetico-musical expressions (or the adaptation of the old forms) to express at the same time the nostalgia of the origins and the anger towards the abusive policies. At these times, English-language musical groups (such as the Beatles) as well as Moroccan groups (e.g. Nass El Ghiwane, Jil Jilala) imposed their rhythms and influenced the development of musical groups known as popular. Mixing modern and traditional instruments, these groups interpreted songs, inspired by the ancestral traditions, using modern instruments and references.

Inspired by this context, Izenzaren (meaning sun rays in Tachelhit) was formed in Agadir in 1972 by six young musicians coming from newly urbanized families. They recorded their first album in 1974, and started since then performing, recording and even making television appearances.

In 1975, after a disagreement between its members, the group split. Two groups claimed then the name: Izenzaren Iggut Abdelhadi and Izenzaren Abdelaziz Chamkh. The first is the better-known, and is named after its iconic lead singer and banjo player Abdelhadi Iggout.

== Group members ==
=== Current members ===
- Abdelhadi Iggout
- Mustapha Chater
- Moulay Brahim Talbi
- Mohamed Hanafi
- Hassan Biri

=== Former members ===
- Abdelaziz Chamkh – Left in 1975 and created his own group. Died in 2014.
- Lahcen Boufertel – Died in 2011.

== Discography ==
During their long career, Izenzaren have issued several songs that became notorious in Tachelhit-speaking regions and performed in several national and international events and festivals. These include:

- ⵣⵣⵉⵏ – Zzin (The beautiful)
- ⵉⵎⵎⵉ ⵃⴻⵏⵏⴰ – Immi ḥenna (Gracious Mother)
- ⵡⴰⴷ ⵉⵜⵜⵎⵓⴷⴷⵓⵏ – Wad ittmuddun (He who travels)
- ⴰⵍⴳⵎⴰⴹ – Algmaḍ (The snake)
