= Groupe scolaire Paul Gauguin =

The Groupe scolaire Paul Gauguin or the Lycée Français Paul Gauguin was a French international school in Agadir, Morocco.

In 2013 an announcement stating that there was a possibility of the school merging with the Lycée Français d'Agadir (LFA) caused an uprising amongst the parents. On 31 August 2014 the school closed, and students were moved to the LFA.
