= Olhão Garden =

Park in Agadir, Morocco

- حديقة أولهاو
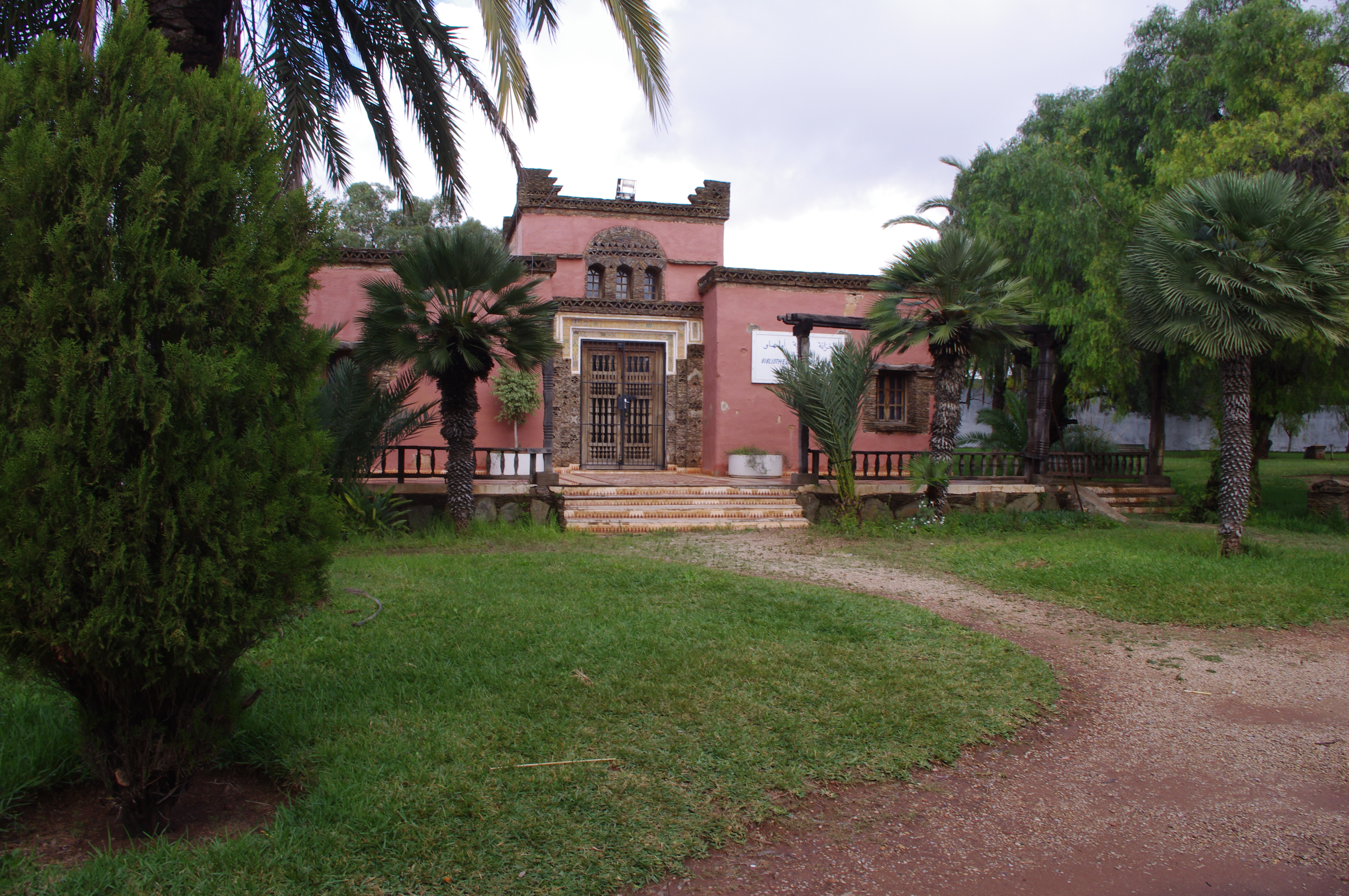
- Main entrance to Olhão Garden
- Location: Agadir, Morocco
- Coordinates: 30°25′29″N 9°35′50″W
- Type: Garden

Olhão Garden is a park in New Talborj in the city of Agadir, Morocco. It was inaugurated on 2 March 1992 during the celebration of the Throne Day. It is named after Olhão, a coastal city in southern Portugal that is twinned with Agadir.
