= Agadir Museum of Art =

Museum in Morocco

- Established: April 2023
- Collections: Museum of contemporary art and Berber cultural and historical heritage

Agadir Museum of Art (French: Agadir Musée d'Art) is an art museum located in Agadir, Morocco, exhibiting both Moroccan and foreign artists, as well as an important collection of the national cultural heritage. Announced in 2022, the museum was inaugurated in April 2023 by Aziz Akhannouch, the mayor of the city and also the head of the government.

== History ==
The building, located in the city center, was long a museum of local heritage and belonged to the municipality. It underwent renovation as part of the "Agadir Urban Development Program (2020-2024)".

Now, the museum is the result of a partnership between the Agadir City Council, the Wilaya of the Souss-Massa Region, and the National Foundation of Museums.

== Collections ==
Showroom

The exhibition route leads visitors through five sections:

- Moroccan cultural traditions and identity through the centuries;
- A panorama of exotic and modern urban scenes;
- Abstraction and memory;
- Reproduction of natural landscapes;
- The human body;

The museum hosts a permanent exhibition of 150 works by Moroccan and foreign artists, donated by the patron El Khalil Belguench.

It also showcases a rich array of ethnographic items such as jewelry, carpets, pottery, and ceramics. Many artifacts reflecting the national cultural heritage are on display for visitors: paintings, jewelry, carpets, porcelain, pottery, mostly of Amazigh (Berber) origin.
