= Paradise Valley (Morocco) =

Section of the Tamraght River valley in Morocco

- Tamraght River Valley
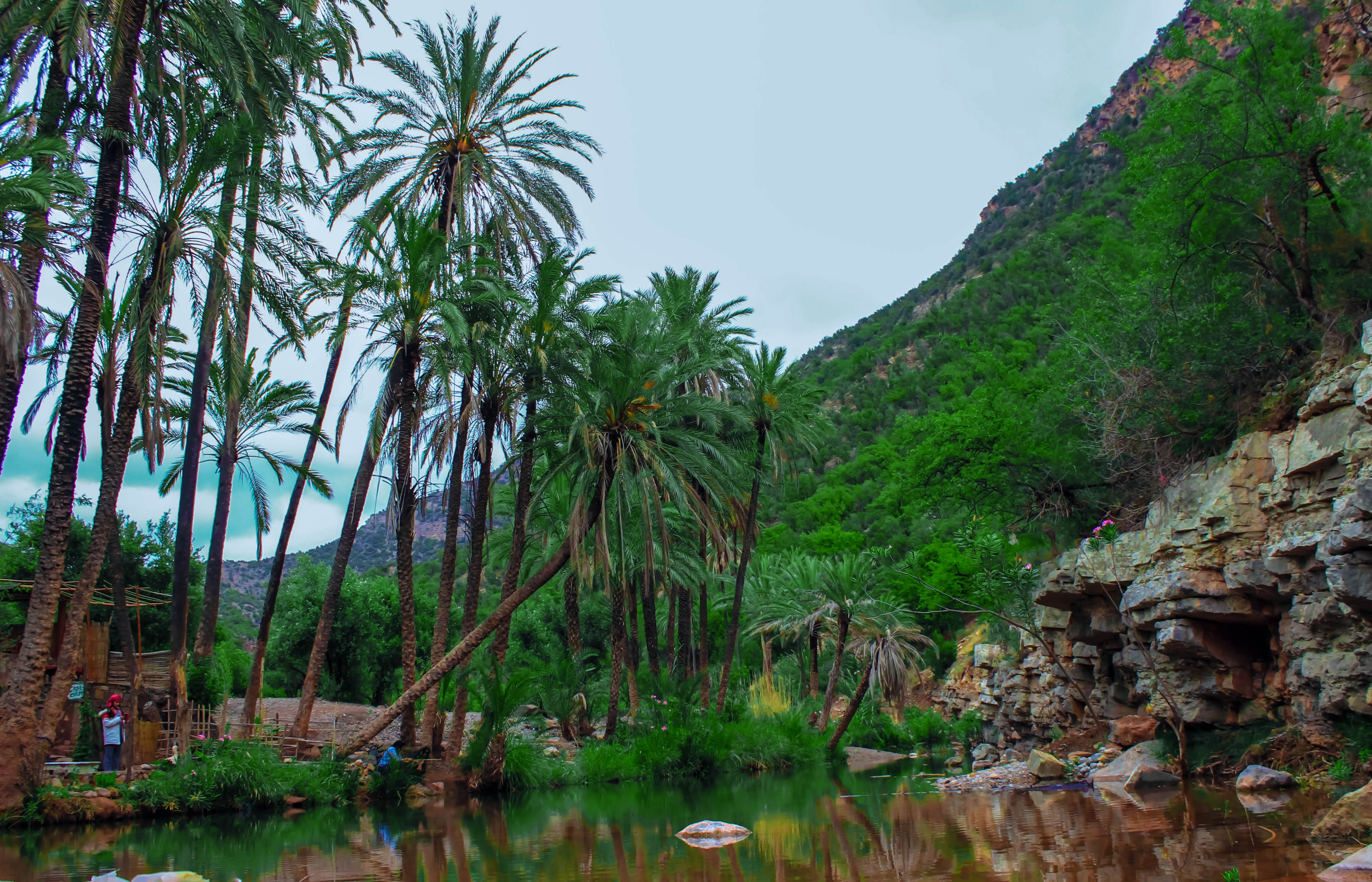
- View of Paradise Valley

Geography
- Coordinates: 30°35′22″N 9°31′22″W
- Interactive map of Paradise Valley

Paradise Valley is a section of the Tamraght River valley in the Moroccan High Atlas mountains.

== Name and location ==
The valley is named since it is often locally likened to a “paradise on earth”. It is also called Tamraght river valley after the name of the surrounding region.

The valley is located approximately 35 km north of the city of Agadir.

== Biodiversity ==
The valley is in the middle of the region of Imouzzar which is known for its broad biodiversity. It includes trees of palm, banana, olive and fig. The valley has numerous small waterfalls and cascades and rocky pools.

== Gallery ==
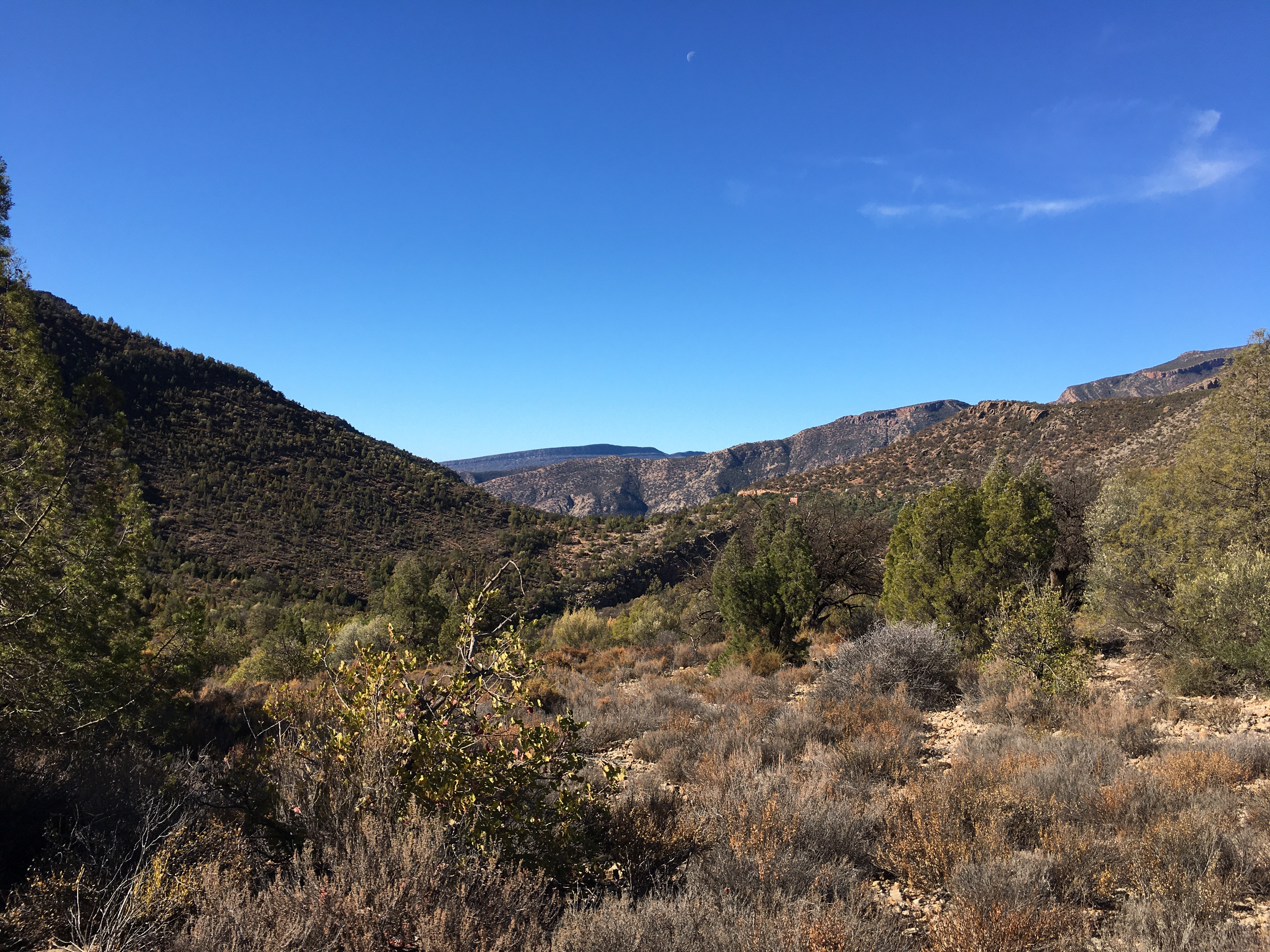
Paradise Valley

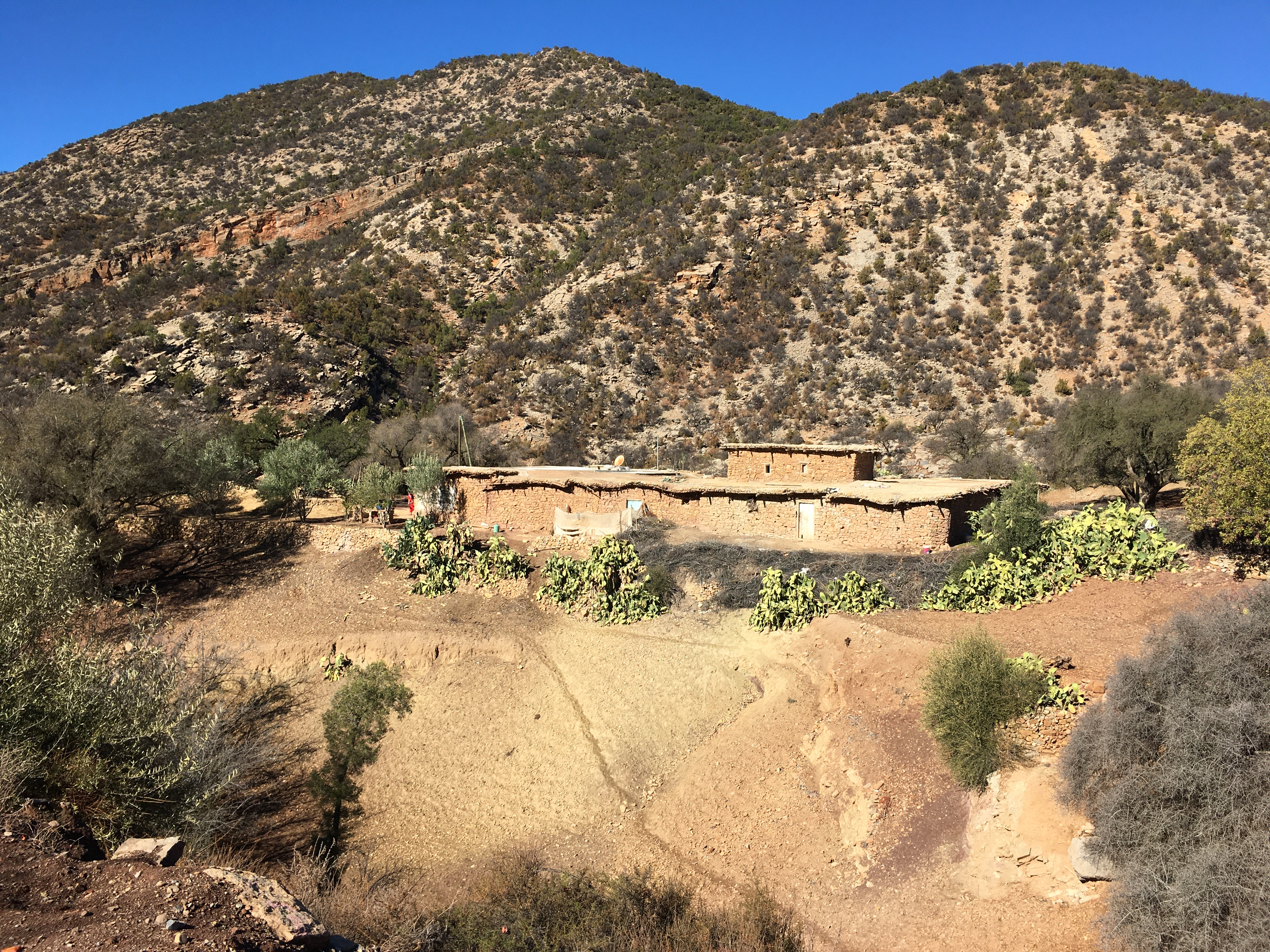
House, Paradise Valley

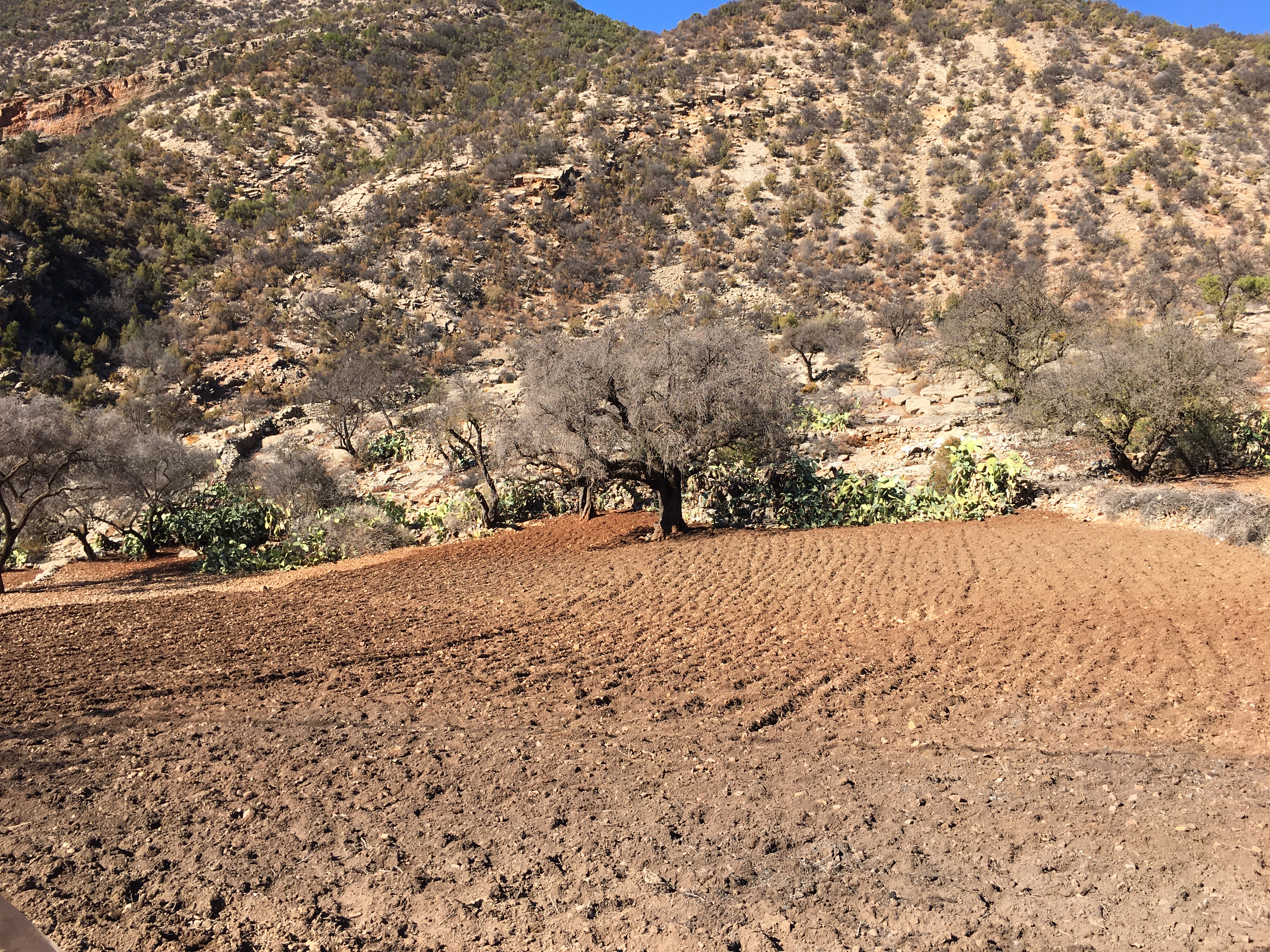
Field in Paradise Valley

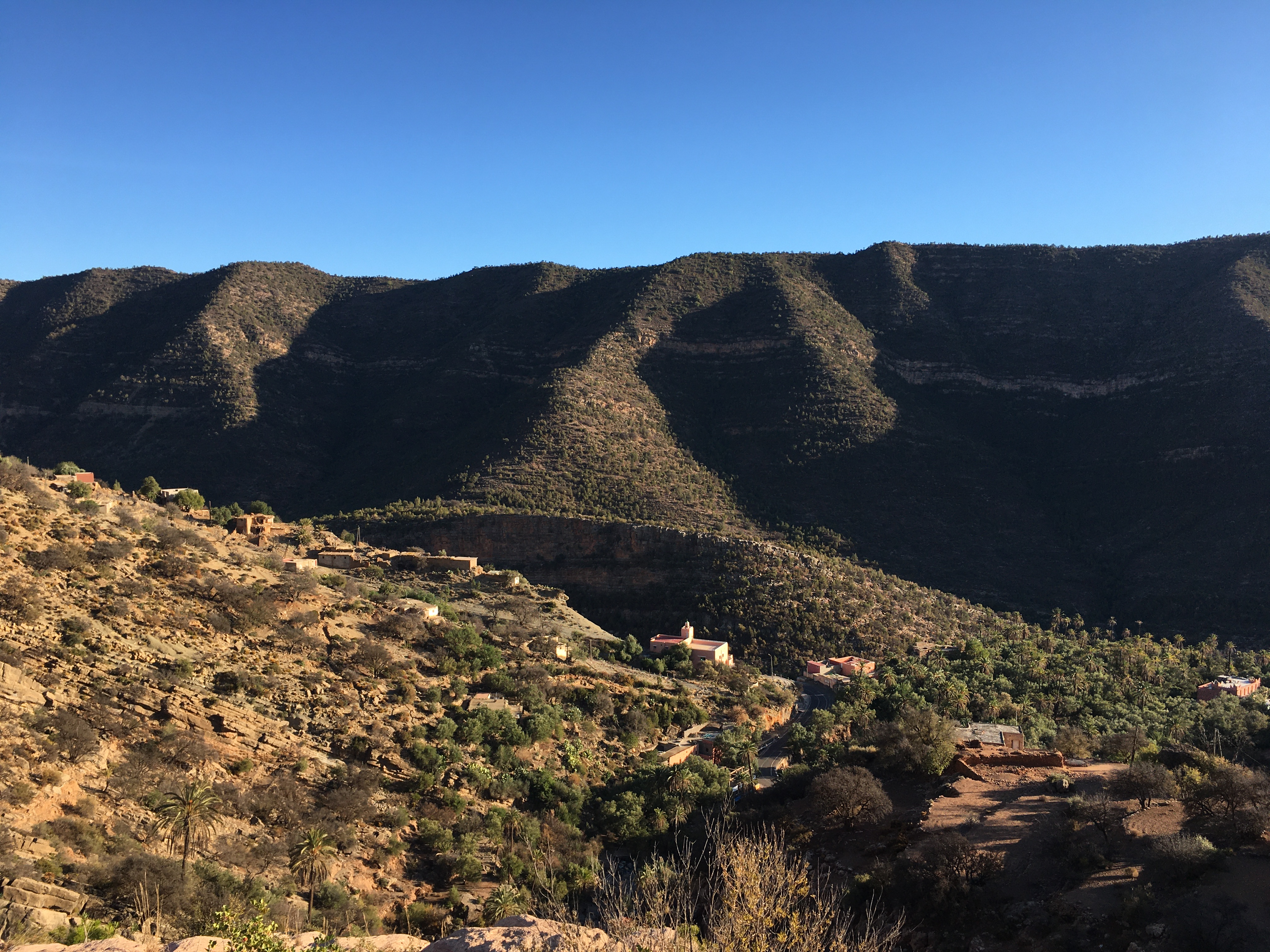
Paradise Valley from the top

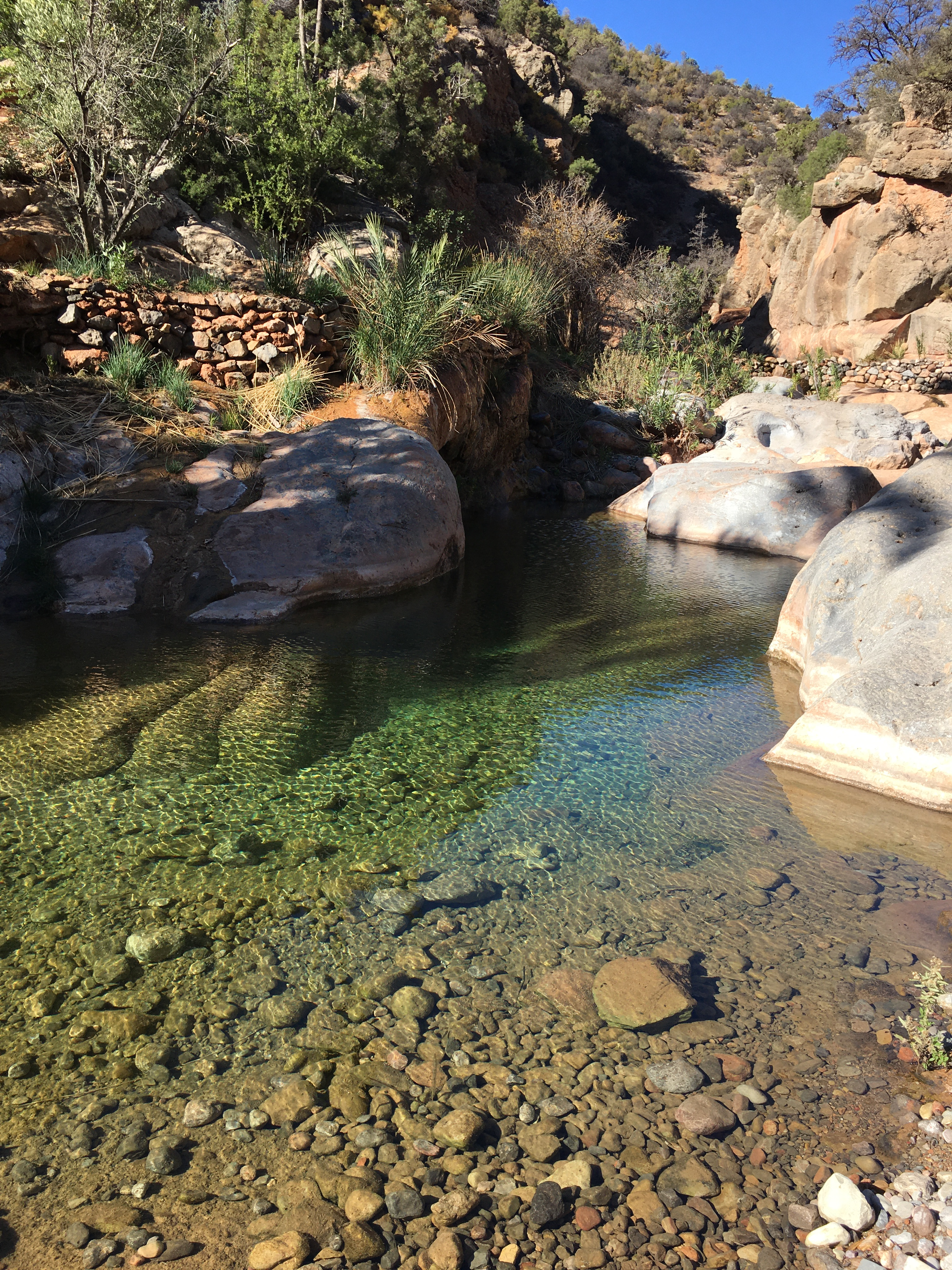
Pool in Paradise Valley

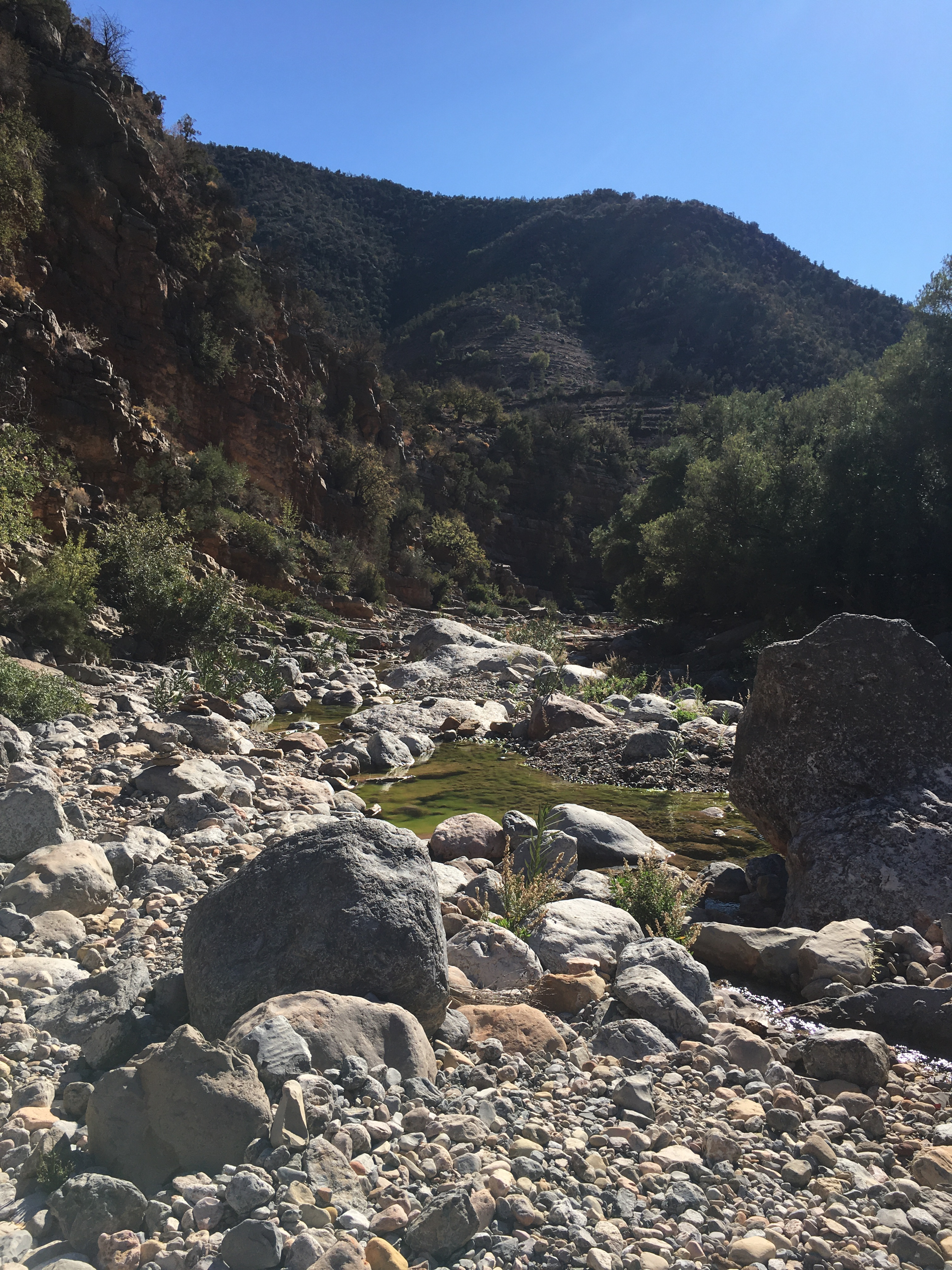
Dry river bed in Paradise Valley

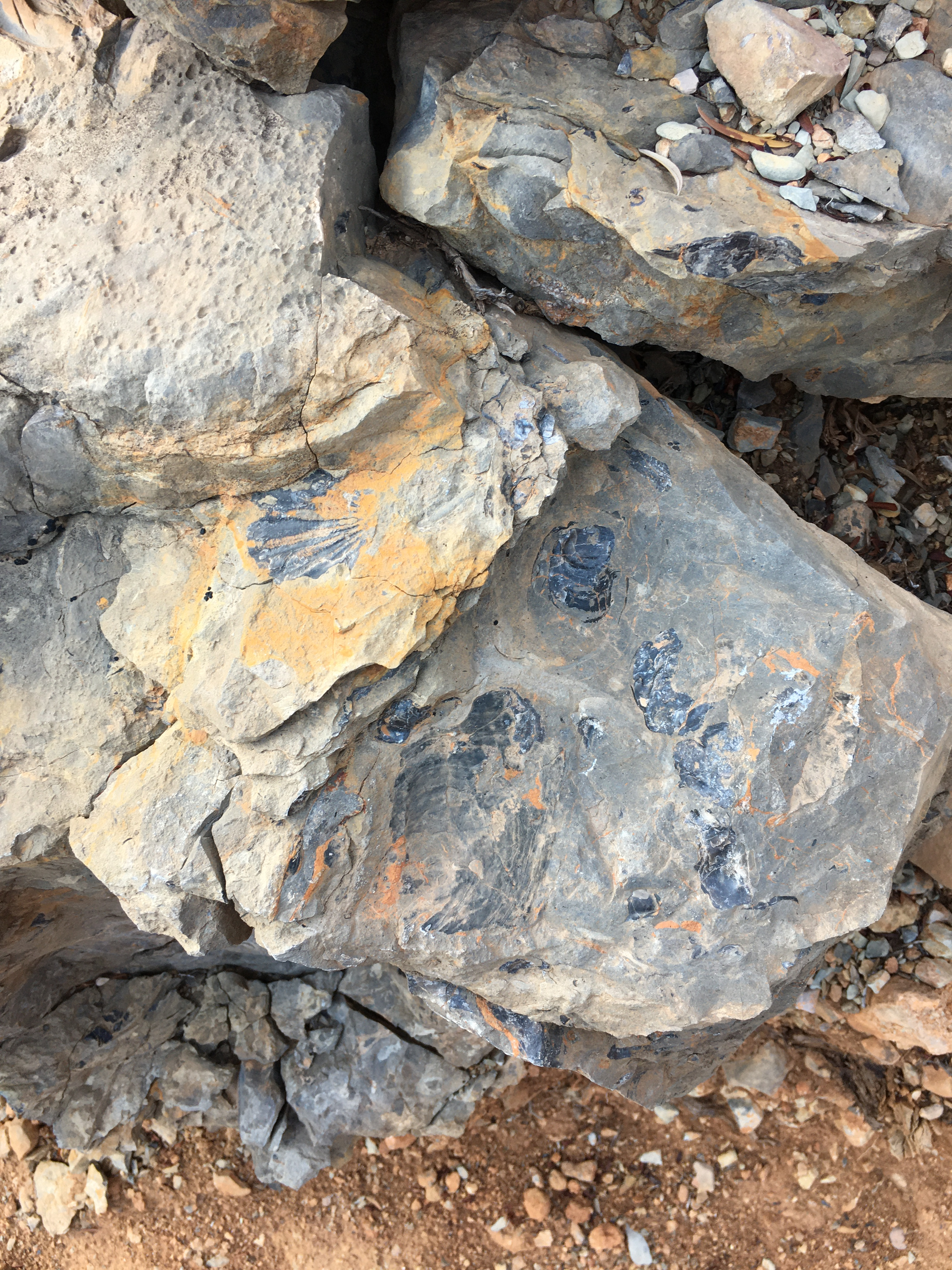
Fossils in Paradise Valley
