= Taghazout Bay =

Seaside resort in southern Morocco

Coordinates: 30.5444°N 9.7051°W

- Resort
- Country: Morocco
- Area: 615 ha (1,520 acres)
- Website: Taghazout Bay

Taghazout Bay is a seaside resort located in South Morocco. Designed according to the Azur plan, it covers 615 hectares (1,520 acres) of a coastline that has 2.8 miles (4.5 km) of beaches.

This future resort will constitute of sports and leisure facilities, such as a beach club, a medina and golf, tennis, surf and soccer academies.

== Société d’Aménagement et de Promotion de la Station de Taghazout (SAPST) ==
SAPST is a public limited company with a capital of four hundred million Dirhams (MAD 400,000,000), owned by four renowned Moroccan shareholders:

Shareholders	Market share
CDG Développement	45%
Moroccan Fund for Tourism Development (FDMT)	25%
Sud Partners (Consortium with Akwa Group on top of it)	25%
Moroccan Tourism Engineering Company (SMIT)	5%

Since it was established in July 2011, SAPST is responsible for the planning, development and management of the Taghazout Bay station.

== Key figures ==
- Total area: 615 ha
- Land Use Ratio: 10,5%
- Target number of beds: 12,316 beds
- 9 hotel units
- Target Tourist accommodation capacity: 7,450 beds
- Overall investment: MAD 10 billion (before tax)
- Achievement of the Touristic program within 5 years
