= Tangier =

City in and capital of Tanger-Tetouan-Al Hoceima, Morocco

Tangier طنجة (Arabic) ⵟⴰⵏⵊⴰ (Tamazight)
- City
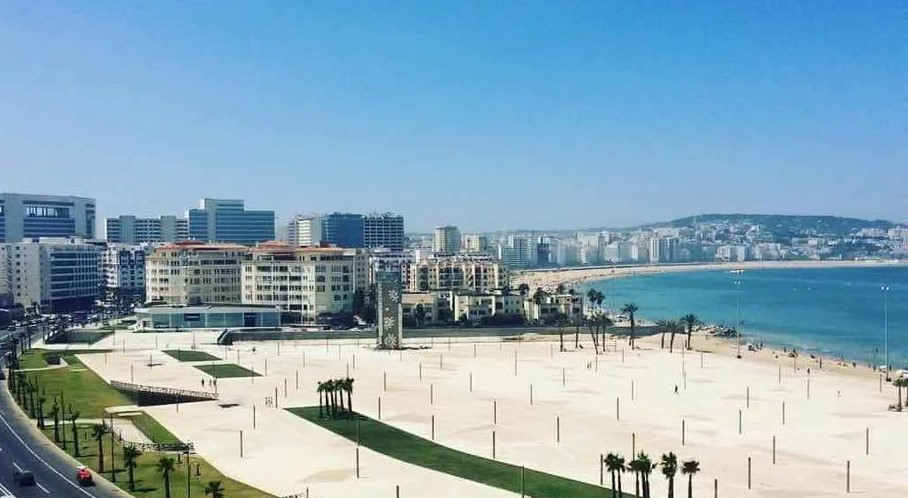
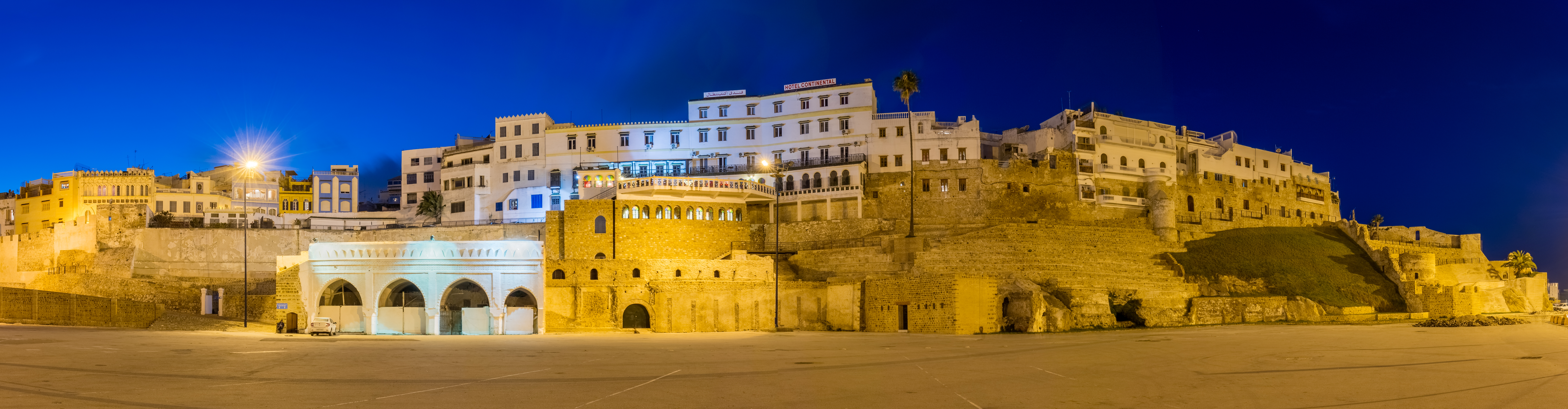
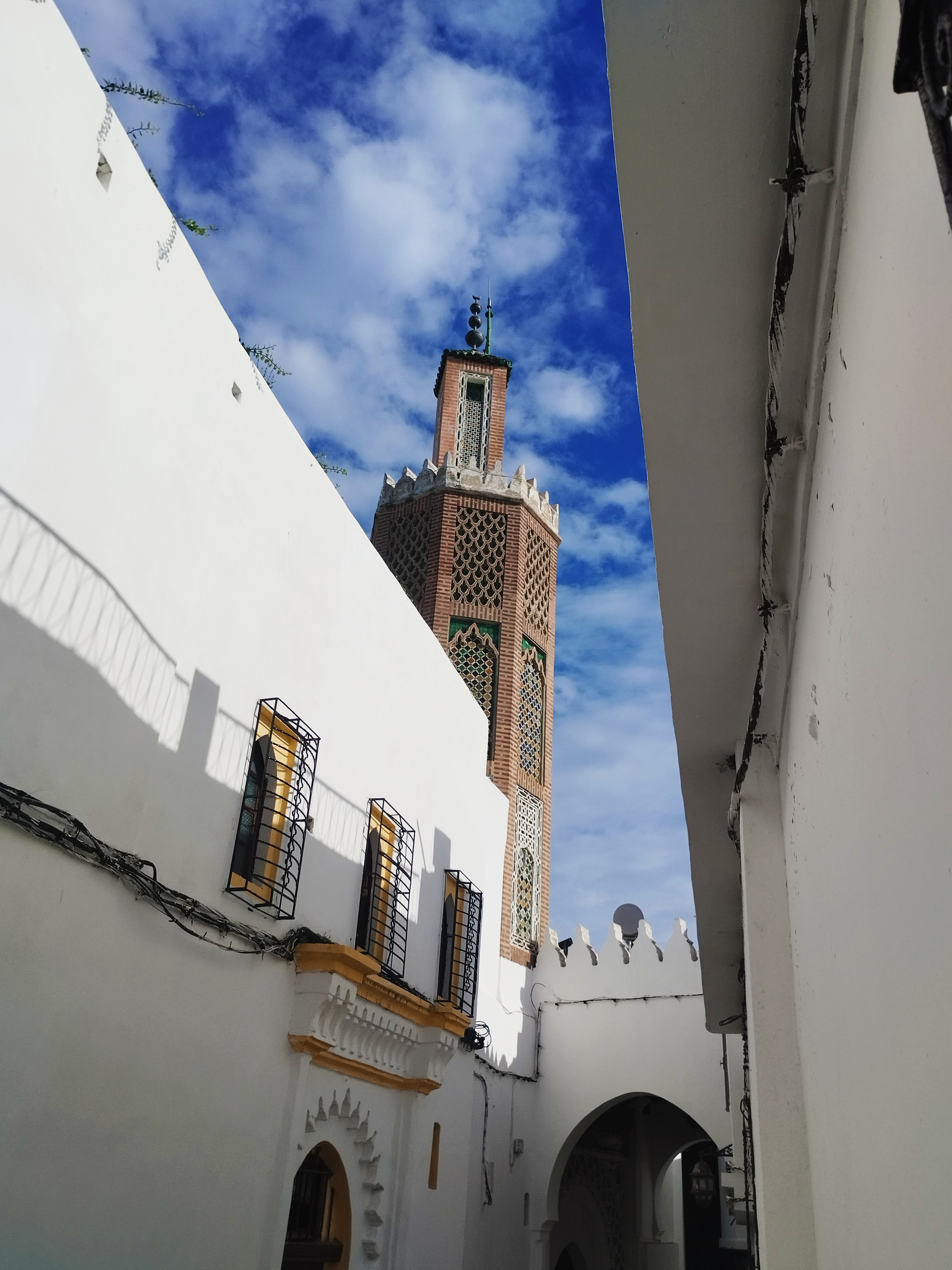
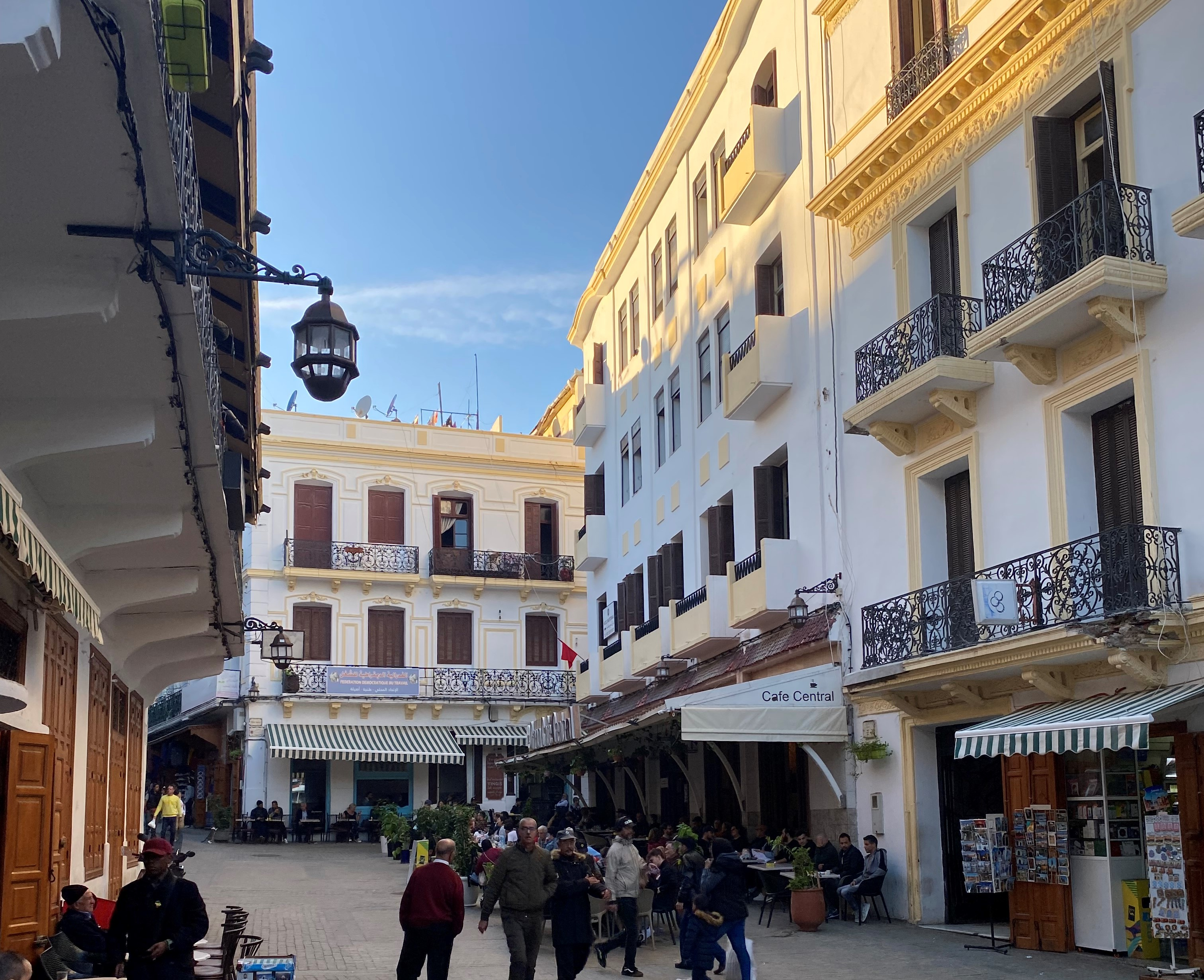
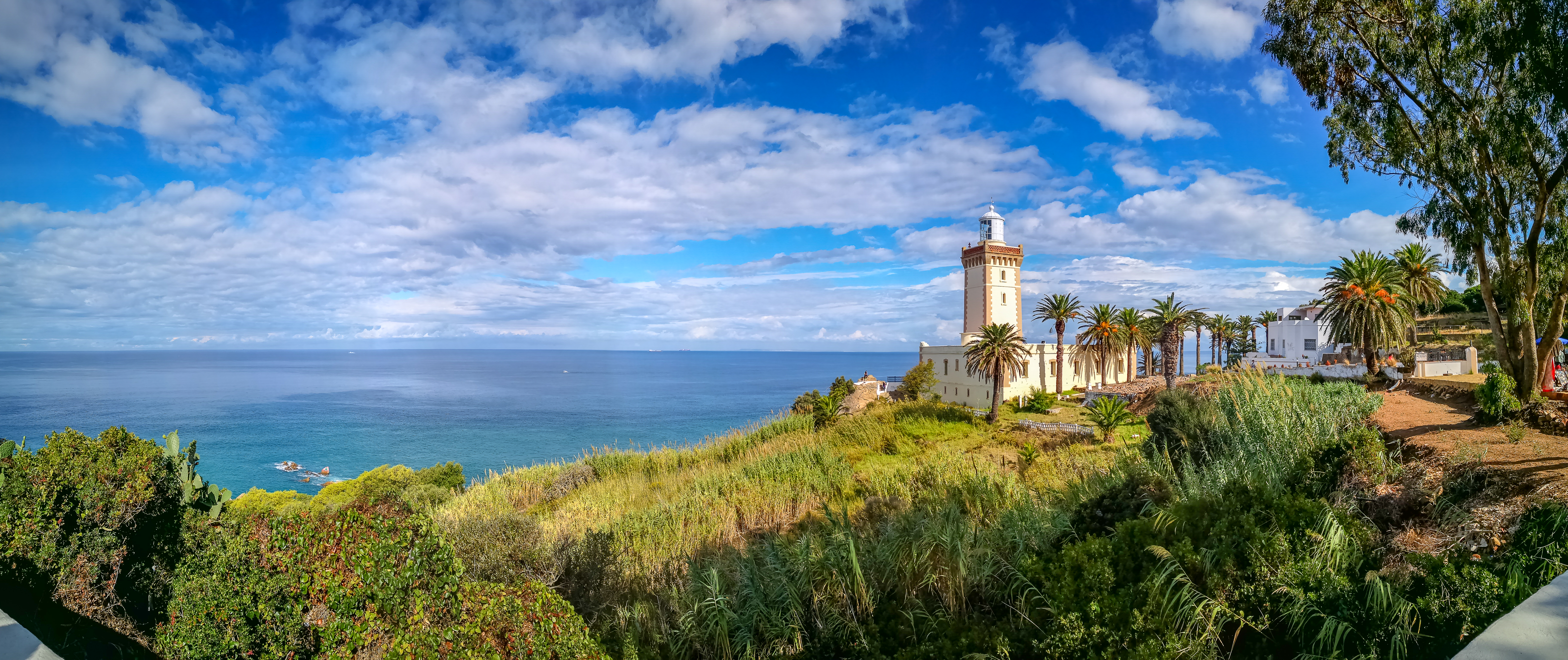
- The Corniche The old city walls Kasbah Mosque Petit Socco Cape Spartel

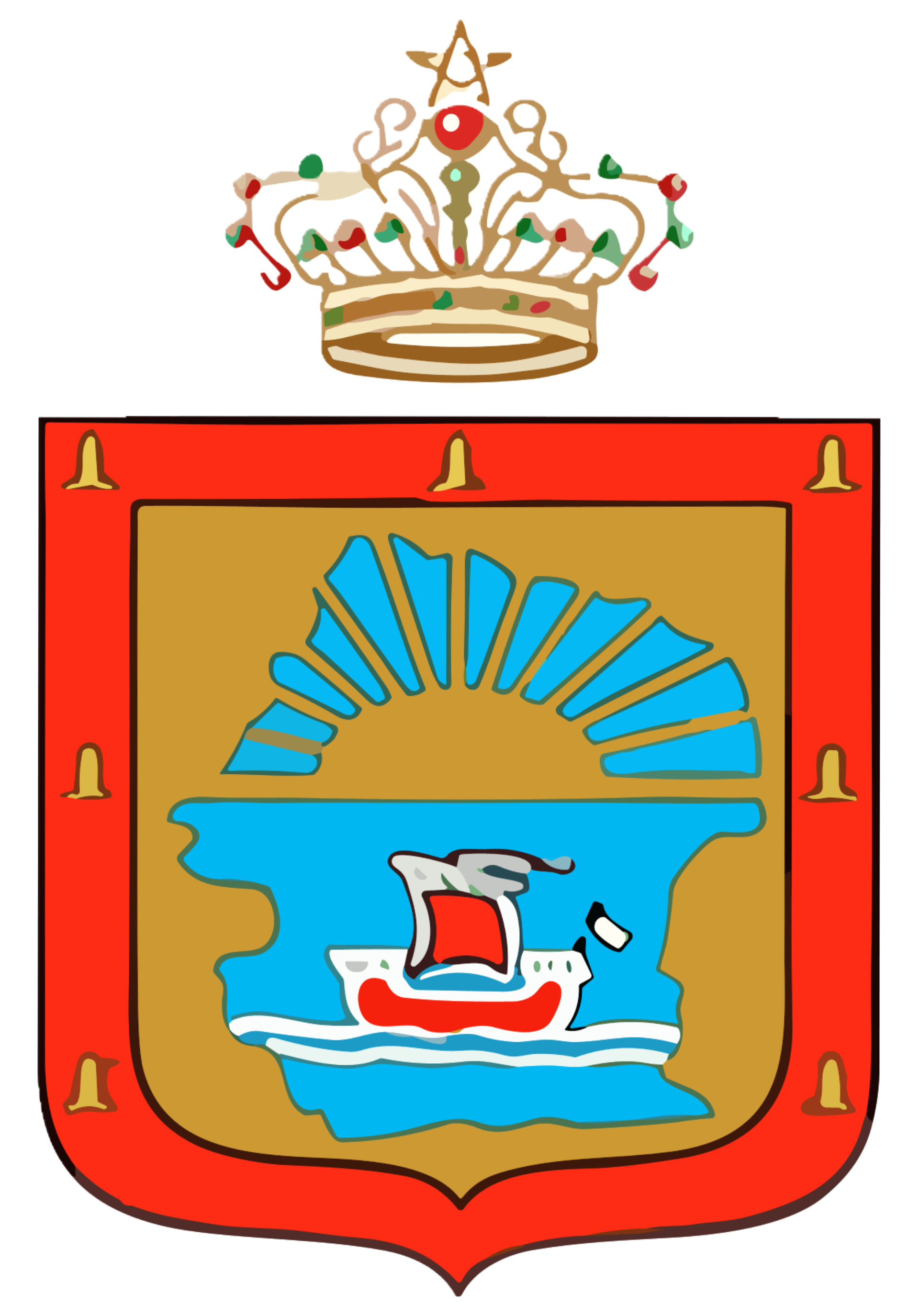
- Coat of arms
- Nicknames: The blue and white city, City of the Boughaz, Bride of the North
- Interactive map of Tangier
- Coordinates: 35°46′36″N 05°48′14″W
- Country: Morocco
- Region: Tanger-Tetouan-Al Hoceima
- Prefecture: Tangier-Assilah Prefecture
- Established: c. 1000 BC

Government
  - Mayor: Mounir Laymouri (PAM)

Area
  - Total: 124 km^{2} (48 sq mi)
- Highest elevation: 230 m (750 ft)
- Lowest elevation: 0 m (0 ft)

Population (2024)
  - Total: 1,275,428
  - Rank: 2nd in Morocco
  - Density: 7,026/km^{2} (18,200/sq mi)
- (Note: The High Commission for Planning defines the city of Tangier as comprising the four arrondissements of Bni Makada, Charf-Mghogha, Charf-Souani and Tanger-Médina.)
- Demonym(s): Tanjawi, Tangierian
- Time zone: UTC+0 (GMT)
- Postal codes: 90000 to 90100, with 90000 serving as the primary code
- Area code: 0539
- Website: tanger.ma

Tangier, (Note: /tænˈdʒɪər/ tan-JEER; Arabic: طنجة, romanized: Ṭanjah, [tˤandʒa], [tˤanʒa] Standard Moroccan Tamazight: ⵟⴰⵏⵊⴰ, romanized: Ṭanja) also called Tangiers, is a city in northwestern Morocco, on the coasts of the Mediterranean Sea and the Atlantic Ocean. The city is the capital of the Tangier-Tetouan-Al Hoceima region, as well as the Tangier-Assilah Prefecture of Morocco.

Many civilisations and cultures have influenced the history of Tangier, starting from before the 10th century BC. Originating as a strategic Phoenician town and trading centre, Tangier has been a nexus for many cultures. In 1923, it became an international zone managed by colonial powers and became a destination for many European and American diplomats, spies, bohemians, writers and businessmen. That status came to an end with Moroccan independence, in phases between 1956 and 1960.

By the early 21st century, Tangier is undergoing rapid development and modernisation. Projects include tourism projects along the bay, a modern business district called Tangier City Centre, an airport terminal, and a football stadium. Tangier's economy is benefiting greatly from the Tanger-Med port.

== Names ==
The Carthaginian name of the city is variously recorded as tng (Punic: 𐤕𐤍𐤂), tngʾ (𐤕𐤍𐤂𐤀), tyngʾ (𐤕𐤉𐤍𐤂𐤀), and ttgʾ (𐤕𐤕𐤂𐤀); these appear in Greek and Roman sources as Tenga, Tinga, Titga, etc. The old Berber name was Tingi (ⵜⵉⵏⴳⵉ), which connects to Berber tingis, meaning "marsh". The Greeks later claimed that Tingís (Ancient Greek: Τιγγίς) had been named for Tinjis, a daughter of the Titan Atlas, who was supposed to support the vault of heaven nearby. Latin Tingis then developed into Portuguese Tânger, Spanish Tánger, and French Tanger, which entered English as Tangier. The Arabic and Tamazight name of the town is Ṭanjah (طَنجة, ⵟⴰⵏⵊⴰ).

Moroccan historian Ahmed Toufiq considers that the name "Tingi" has the same etymology as Tinghir, and is composed of "Tin", which is a feminine particle that could be translated as "owner" or "she who has", and "gi" which may have originally been "ig", meaning "high location". This corresponds to the popular Moroccan phrase Tanja l-ɛalya (Tangier the High), which may be a remnant echo of the original meaning, as well as a reference to the high location of Tangier. A similar construction can be found in the name of Tinmel, the first capital of the Almohads, which is composed of "Tin", and "Amlel" meaning "at foot of the mountain" or "at a low location".

Tangier was formally known as Colonia Julia Tingi ("The Julian Colony of Tingis") following its elevation to colony status during the Roman Empire. The nicknames "Bride of the North" and "Door of Africa" reference its position in far northwestern Africa, near the Strait of Gibraltar.

The fruit tangerine is named for Tangier.

== History ==
=== Ancient ===
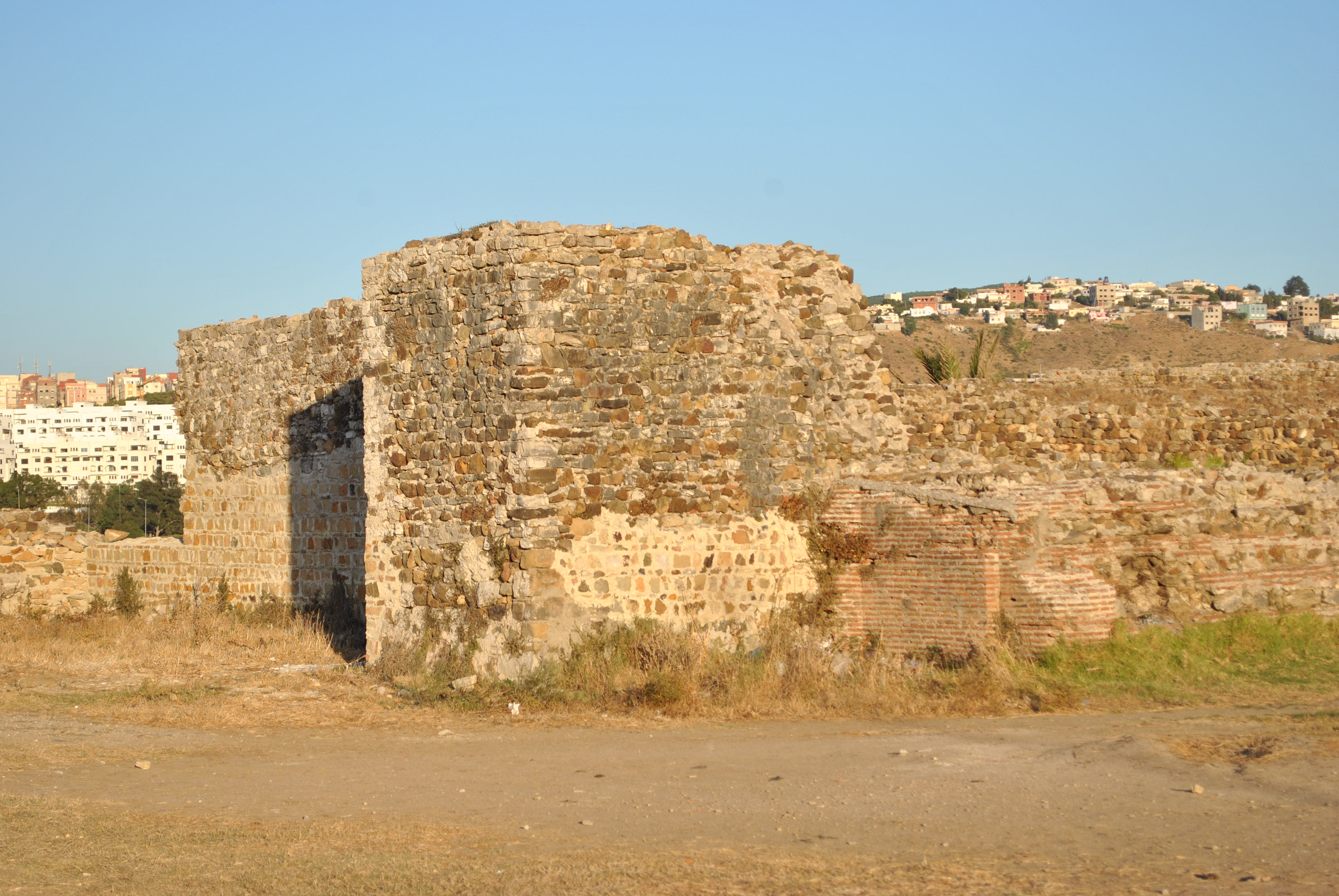
Surviving parts of the wall of Roman Tingis

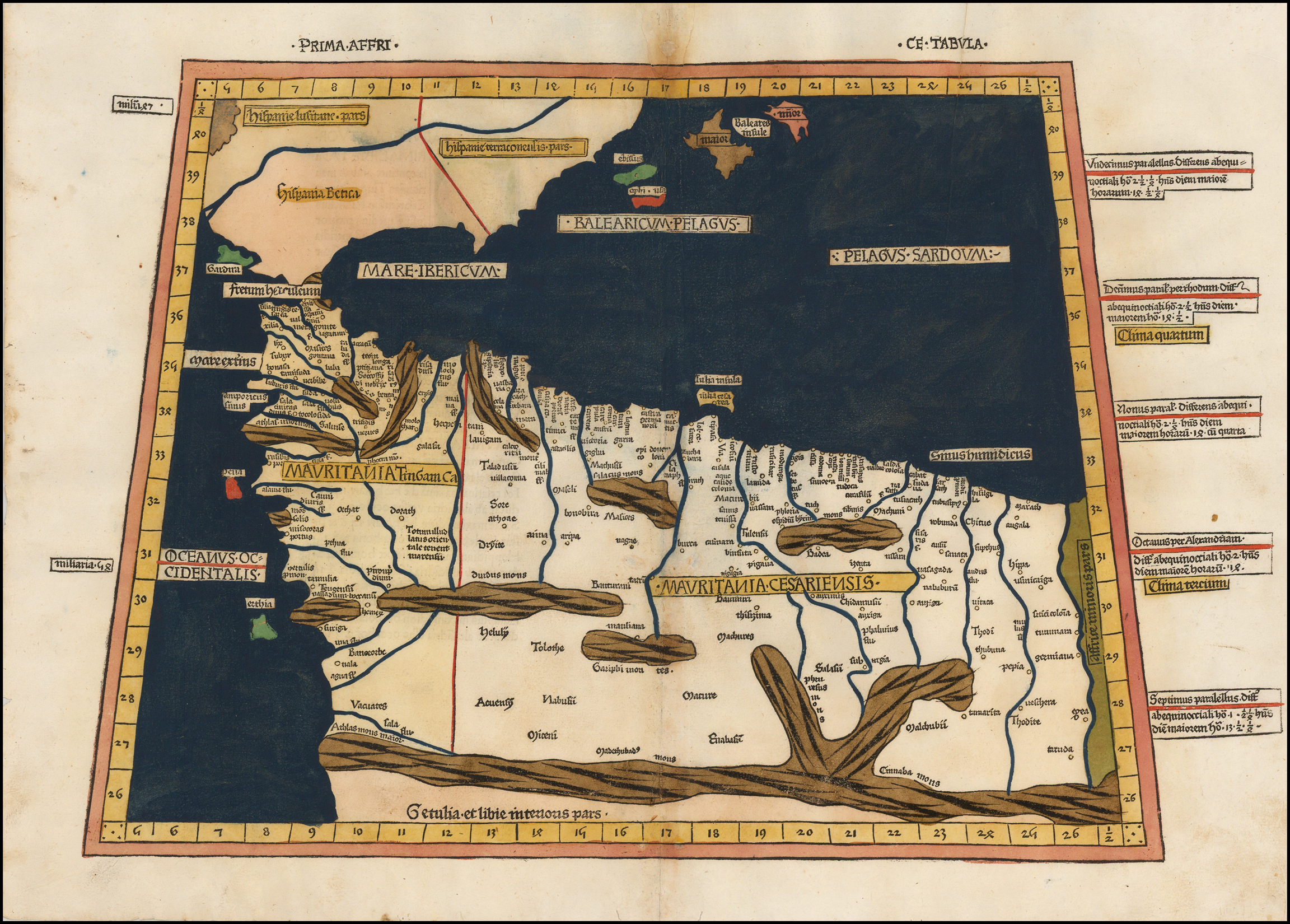
Ptolemy's 1st African map, showing Roman Mauretania Tingitana

Tangier was founded as a Phoenician colony, possibly as early as the 10th century BCE and almost certainly by the 8th century BCE. The majority of Berber tombs around Tangier had Punic jewelry by the 6th century BCE, speaking to abundant trade by that time. The Carthaginians developed it as an important port of their empire by the 5th century BCE. It was probably involved with the expeditions of Hanno the Navigator along the West African coast. The city long preserved its Phoenician traditions, issuing bronze coins under the Mauretanian kings with Punic script. Under the Romans other coins were issued, bearing Augustus and Agrippa's heads and Latin script obverse but an image of the Canaanite god Baal reverse. Some editions of Procopius place his Punic stelae in Tingis rather than Tigisis; in either case, however, their existence is highly dubious.

The Greeks knew this town as Tingis and, with some modification, record the Berber legends of its founding. Supposedly Tinjis, daughter of Atlas and widow of Antaeus, slept with Hercules and bore him the son Sufax. After Tinjis' death, Sufax then founded the port and named it in her honour. The gigantic skeleton and tomb of Antaeus were tourist attractions for ancient visitors. The Caves of Hercules, where he supposedly rested on Cape Spartel during his labors, remain one today.

Tingis came under the control of the Roman ally Mauretania during the Punic Wars. Quintus Sertorius, in his war against Sulla's regime in Rome, took and held Tingis for several years in the 70s BCE. It was subsequently returned to the Mauretanians but established as a republican free city during the reign of Bocchus II in 38 BCE.

Tingis received certain municipal privileges under Augustus and became a Roman colony under Claudius, who made it the provincial capital of Mauretania Tingitana. Under Diocletian's 291 reforms, it became the seat of a count (comes) and Tingitana's governor (praeses). At the same time, the province itself shrank to little more than the ports along the coast and, owing to the Great Persecution, Tingis was also the scene of the martyrdoms by beheading of Saints Marcellus and Cassian in 298. Tingis remained the largest settlement in its province in the 4th century and was greatly developed.

=== Medieval ===
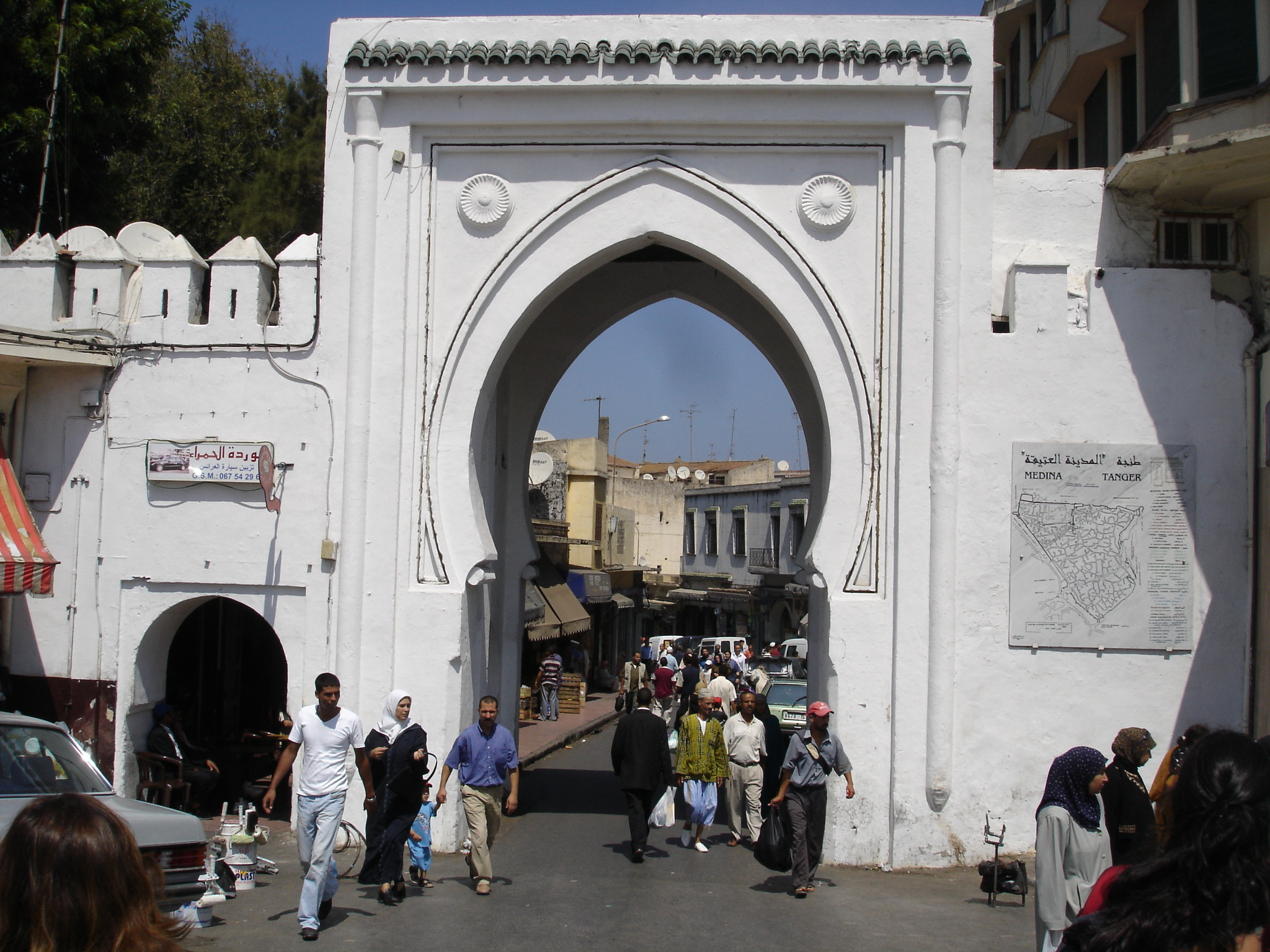
Entrance gate to the medina

Probably invited by Count Boniface, who feared war with the empress dowager, tens of thousands of Vandals under Gaiseric crossed into North Africa in 429 CE and occupied Tingis and Mauretania, as far east as Calama. When Boniface learned that he and the empress had been manipulated against each other by Aetius, he attempted to compel the Vandals to return to Spain but was instead defeated at Calama in 431. The Vandals lost control of Tingis and the rest of Mauretania during various Berber uprisings.

Tingis was reconquered by Belisarius, the general of the Byzantine emperor Justinian I, in 533 as part of the Vandalic War. The new provincial administration was moved, however, to the more defensible base at Septem (present-day Ceuta). Byzantine control probably yielded to pressure from Visigoth Spain around 618.

Count Julian of Ceuta supposedly led the last defences of Tangier against the Islamic conquest of the Maghreb. Medieval romance made his betrayal of Christendom a personal vendetta against the Visigoth king Roderic over the honour of his daughter; however, Tangier at last fell to a siege by the forces of Musa bin Nusayr between 707 and 711. While Musa bin Nusayr moved south through central Morocco, he had his deputy at Tangier Tariq ibn Zayid, Musa's mawla launch the beginning of the Islamic conquest of Spain. Uqba ibn Nafi was frequently but erroneously credited with Tangier's conquest by medieval historians, but only owing to Musa's later commission at the hands of Al-Walid I.

Under the Umayyads, Tangier served as the capital of the Moroccan district (Maghreb al-Aqsa or al-Udwa) of the province of Africa (Ifriqiya). The conquest of the Maghreb and Spain had, however, been undertaken principally as raids for slaves and plunder and the caliphate's leadership continued to treat all Berbers as pagans or slaves for tax purposes, even after their wholesale conversion to Islam. In the area around Tangier, these hateful taxes were mostly paid in female slaves or in tender lambskins obtained by beating the ewes to induce premature birth. Governor Yazid was murdered by Berber guards whom he had tattooed as slaves in c. 720, and in the 730s, similar treatment from Governor Ubayd Allah and al-Muradi, his deputy at Tangier, provoked the Berber Revolt. Inspired by the egalitarian Kharijite heresy, Barghawata and others under Maysara al-Matghari seized Tangier in the summer of 740. In the Battle of the Nobles on the city's outskirts a few months later, Maysara's replacement Khalid ibn Hamid massacred the cream of Arab nobility in North Africa. An enraged Caliph Hisham ordered an attack from a second army "whose beginning is where they are and whose end is where I am," but this army was defeated at Bagdoura the next year. The Barghawata were concentrated further south on the Atlantic coast, and area around Tangier fell into chaos until 785.

The Shia Arab refugee Idris arrived at Tangier before moving further south, marrying into local tribes around Moulay Idriss and assembling an army that, among its other conquests, took Tangier c. 790. During the division of the sultanate that occurred on the death of Idris II, Tangier fell to his son Qasim in 829. It was soon taken by Qasim's brother Umar, who ruled it until his death in 835. Umar's son Ali became sultan (r. 874–883), as did Qasim's son Yahya after him (r. 880–904), but they governed from Fez.

The Fatimid caliph Abdullah al-Madhi began interfering in Morocco in the early 10th century, prompting the Umayyad emir of Cordova to proclaim himself caliph and to begin supporting proxies against his rivals. He helped the Maghrawa Berbers overrun Melilla in 927, Ceuta in 931, and Tangier in 949. Tangier's governor was subsequently named chief over Cordova's Moroccan possessions and allies. Ali ibn Hammud, named Cordova's governor for Ceuta in 1013, took advantage of the realm's civil wars to conquer Tangier and Málaga before overrunning Cordova itself and proclaiming himself caliph in 1016. His Barghawata ally Rizḳ Allāh was then permitted to rule from Tangier with general autonomy.

Yusuf ibn Tashfin captured Tangier for the Almoravids in 1077. It fell to Abd al-Mumin's Almohads in the 1147, and then flourished under his dynasty, with its port highly active.

Like Ceuta, Tangier did not initially acknowledge the Marinids after the fall of the Almohads. Instead, the local chief Yusuf ibn Muhammad pledged himself to the Hafsids in Tunisia and then to the Abbasids in the east before being killed in ah 665 (late 1266 or early 1267). Abu Yusuf Yaqub compelled Tangier's allegiance with a three months' siege in 1274.

The next century was an obscure time of rebellions and difficulties for the city. During this time, the traveler Ibn Battuta was born in Tangier in 1304, leaving home at 20 for the hajj. Piracy from Tangier and Salé began to harass shipping in the strait and North Atlantic in the late 14th century. A partial plan of the late medieval kasbah was found in a Portuguese document now held by the Military Archives of Sweden in Stockholm.

=== Early modern ===
When the Portuguese started their colonial expansion by taking Ceuta in retribution for its piracy in 1415, Tangier was always a major goal. They failed to capture it in 1437, 1458, and 1464, but occupied it unopposed on 28 August 1471 after its garrison fled upon learning of the conquest of Asilah. As in Ceuta, they converted its chief mosque into the town's cathedral church; it was further embellished by several restorations during the town's occupation. In addition to the cathedral, the Portuguese raised European-style houses and Franciscan and Dominican chapels and monasteries. The Wattasids assaulted Tangier in 1508, 1511, and 1515 but without success. In the 17th century, it passed with the rest of Portugal's domains into Spanish control as part of the personal union of the crowns but maintained its Portuguese garrison and administration.

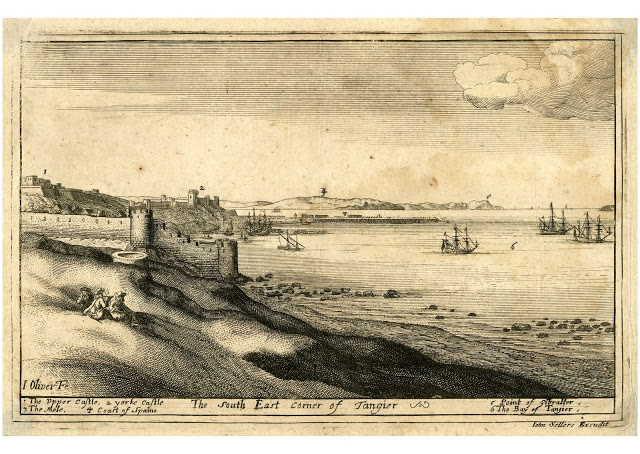
Tangier in the 17th century

Iberian rule lasted until 1661, when it was given to England's King Charles II as part of the dowry of the Portuguese infanta Catherine of Braganza. A squadron under the admiral and ambassador Edward Montagu arrived in November. English Tangier, fully occupied in January 1662, was praised by Charles as "a jewell of immense value in the royal diadem" despite the departing Portuguese taking away everything they could, even—according to the official report—"the very fflowers, the Windowes and the Dores". Tangier received a garrison and a charter which made it equal to other English towns, but the religious orders were expropriated, the Portuguese residents nearly entirely left, and the town's Jews were driven out owing to fears concerning their loyalty. Meanwhile, the Tangier Regiment were almost constantly under attack by locals who considered themselves mujahideen fighting a jihad. Their principal leader was Khadir Ghaïlan (known to the English as "Gayland" or "Guyland") of the Banu Gurfat, whom the Earl of Peterborough attempted to buy off. Ultimately, the truce lasted only for part of 1663 and 1664; on May 4 of the latter year, the Earl of Teviot and around 470 members of the garrison were killed in an ambush beside Jew's Hill. Lord Belasyse happened to secure a longer-lasting treaty in 1666: Khadir Ghaïlan hoped to support a pretender against the new Alawid sultan Al-Rashid and things subsequently went so badly for him that he was obliged to abide by its terms until his death in 1673.

The English took advantage of the respite to improve greatly the Portuguese defences. They also planned to improve the harbour by building a mole, which would have allowed it to play the same role that Gibraltar later played in British naval strategy. Incompetence, waste and outright fraud and embezzlement caused costs to swell; among those enriched was Samuel Pepys. The mole cost £340,000 and reached 1,436 ft (438 m) long before its destruction. Although funding was found for the fortifications, the garrison's pay was delayed until in December 1677 it was 2 1/4 years in arrears; Governor Fairborne dealt with the ensuing mutiny by seizing one of the soldier's muskets and killing him with it on the spot. The expense was partly borne by Ireland: the Tangier establishment was charged to the Irish Exchequer until 1684, and in 1678 Ireland was required to contribute £44,000 annually towards its maintenance.

A determined siege by Sultan Moulay Ismail of Morocco between 1678 and 1680 was unsuccessful, but longstanding exasperation with the colony's finances and the difficulties caused by the siege pushed Parliament to write off the effort in 1680. At the time, Tangier's population consisted of only about 700 apart from the thousand-man garrison; Governor Kirke estimated 400 of them had suffered gonorrhea from the same "mighty pretty" sex worker. Forces under Lord Dartmouth (including Samuel Pepys) methodically destroyed the town and its port facilities for five months prior to Morocco's occupation of the city on 7 February 1684.

Ali ibn Abdallah and his son Ahmed ibn Ali served in turn as the town's governors until 1743, repopulating it with populace from the surrounding countryside. They were powerful enough to oppose Sultan Abdallah through his various reigns, giving support and asylum to his various rivals within and without the royal family.

The city was attacked by Spain in 1790.

=== Internationalisation ===
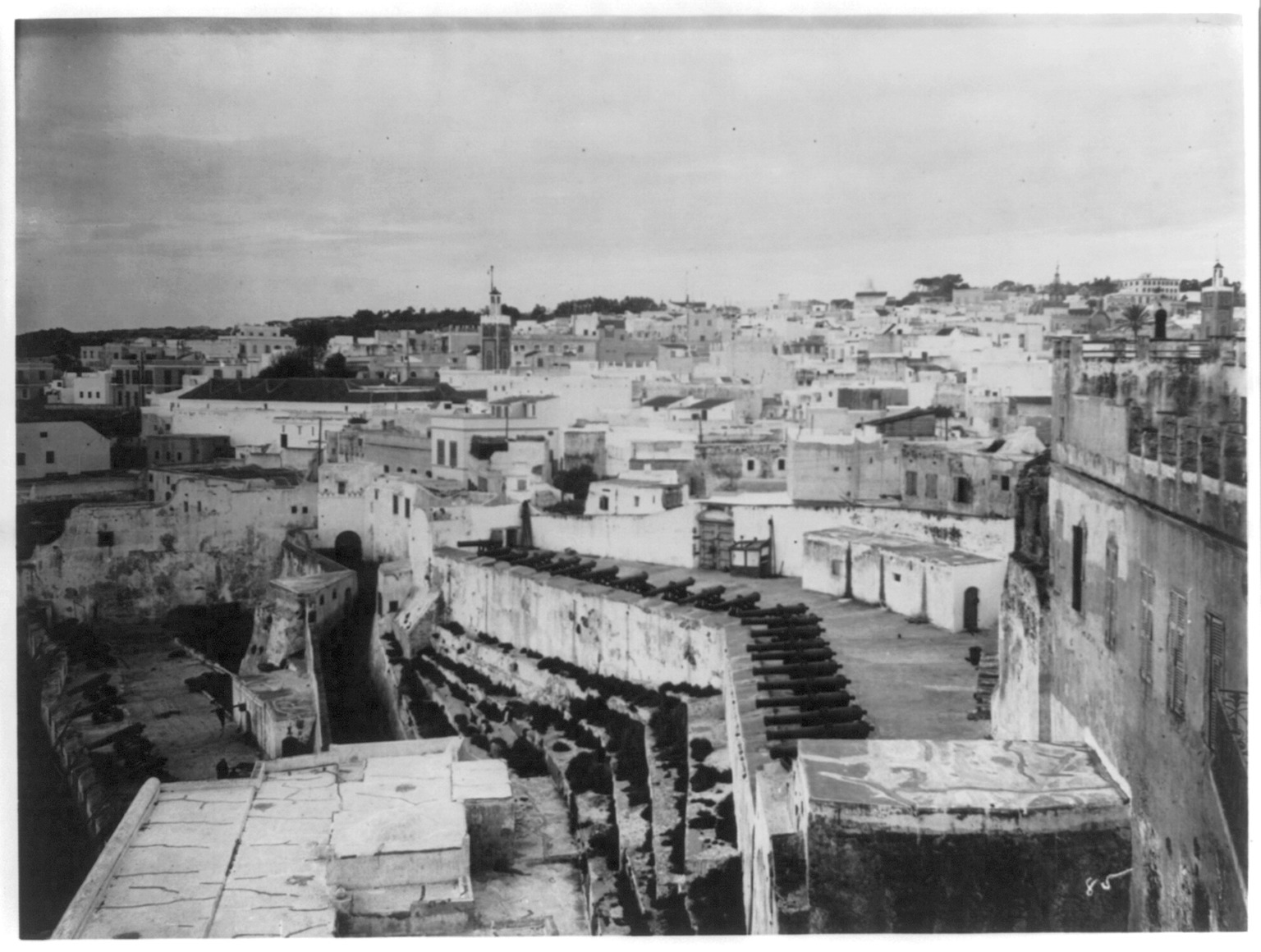
View of the casbah from the Hotel Continental, including harbor defenses, 1894

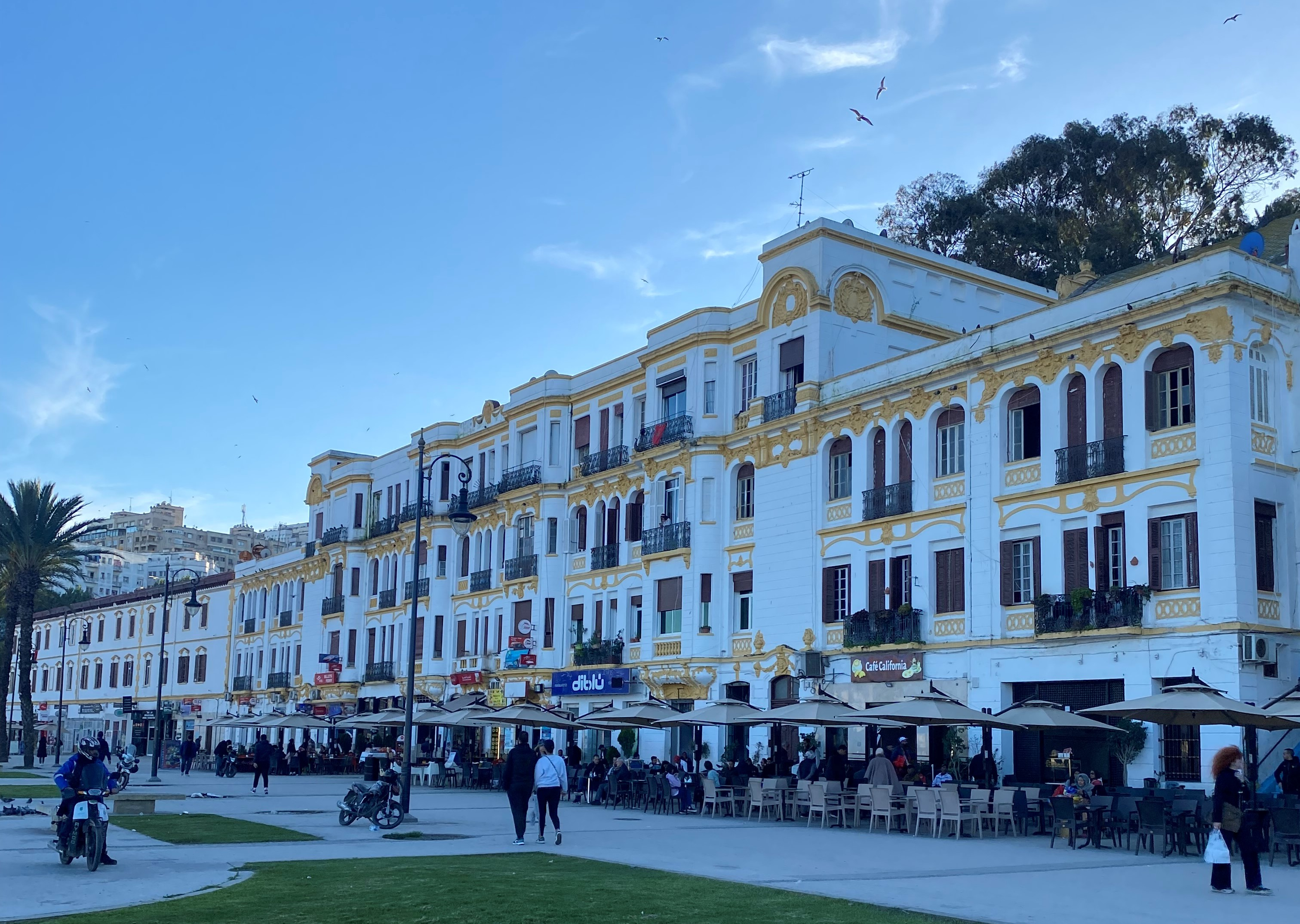
Renschhausen building, erected around 1913 by German businessman Adolf Renschhausen, exemplar of German influence in pre-World-War-I Tangier

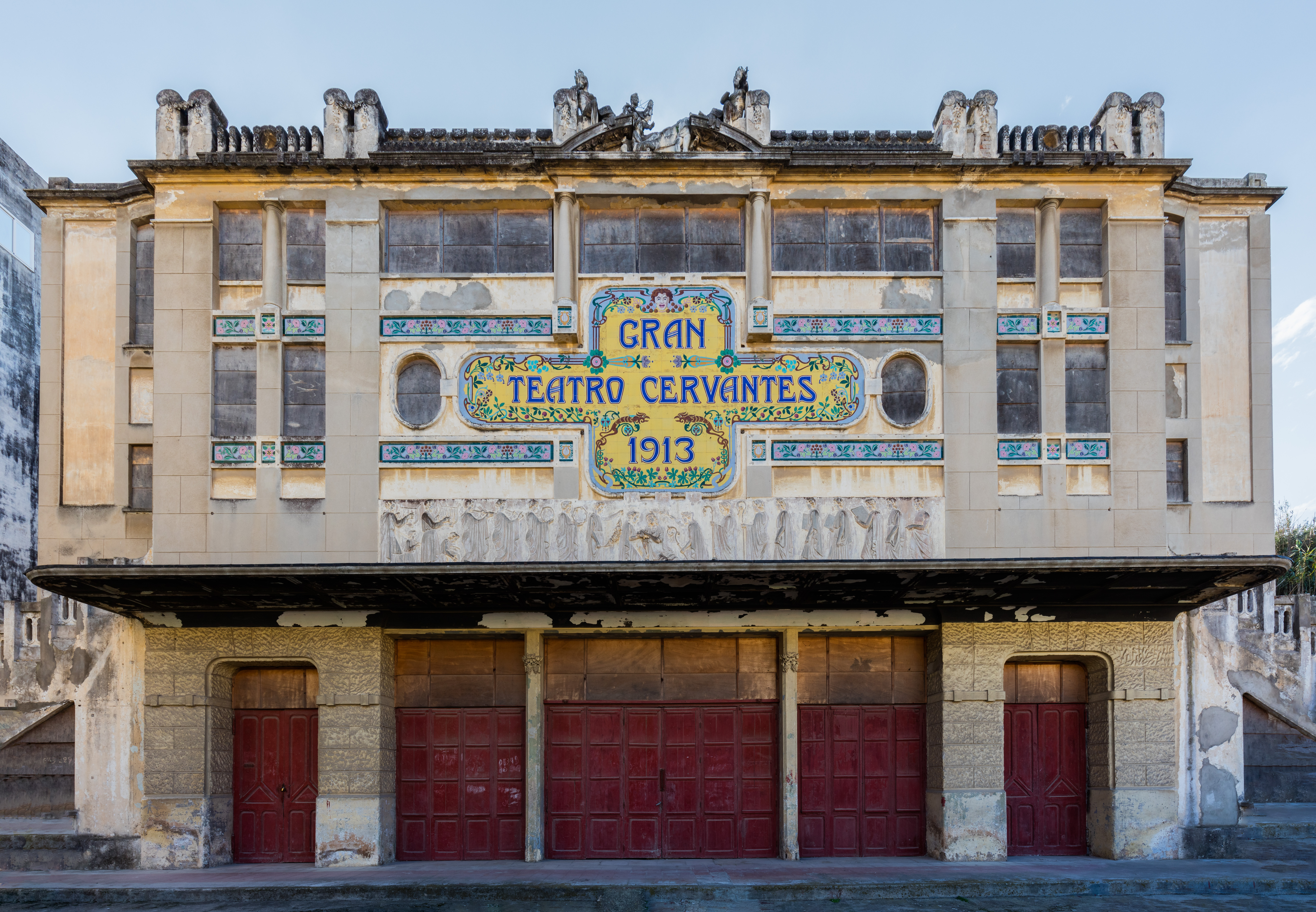
Gran Teatro Cervantes, built by the Spanish in 1913

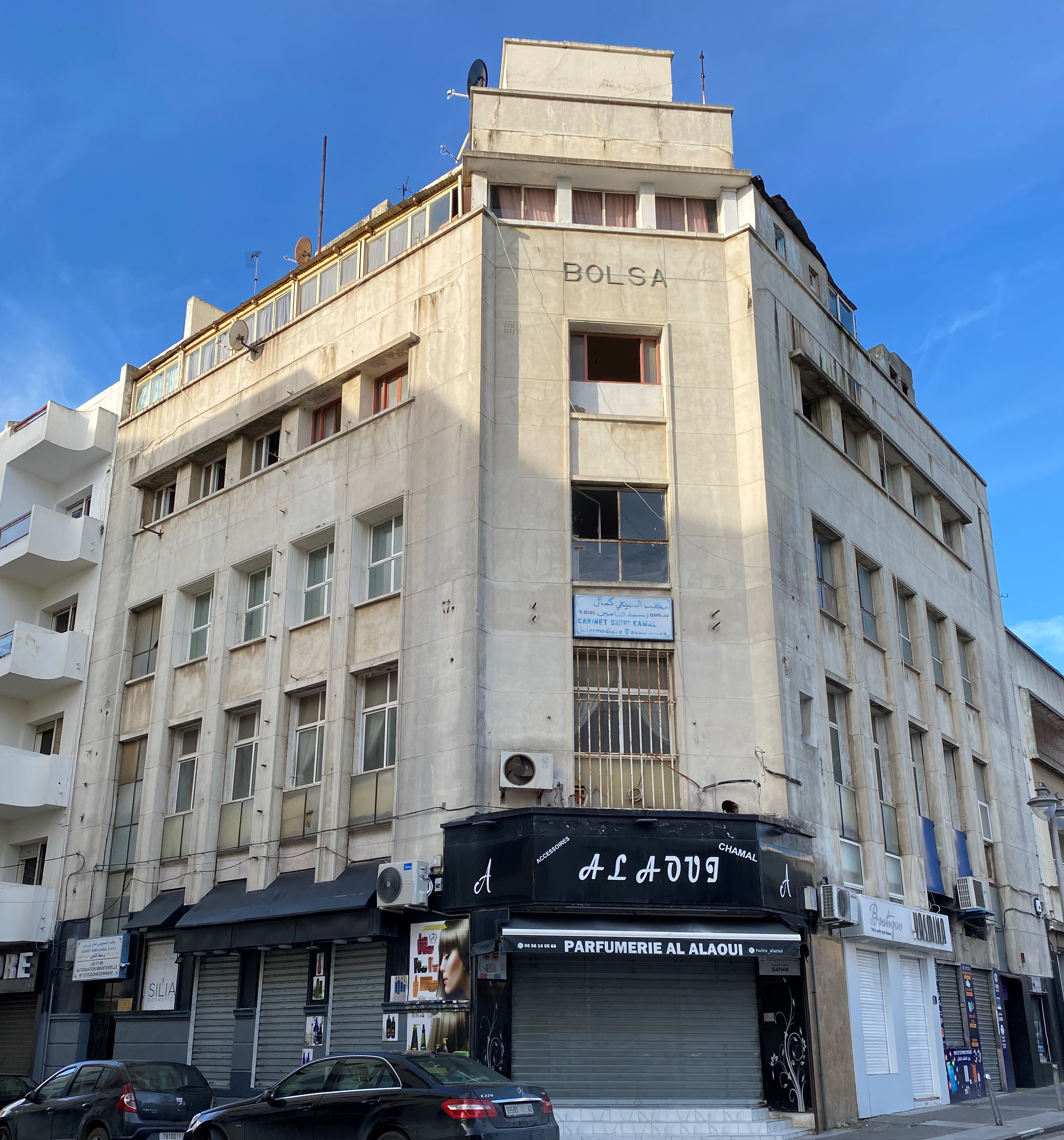
Former stock exchange building in the Ville Nouvelle

From the 18th century onward, Tangier served as Morocco's diplomatic headquarters. The United States opened its first consulate in Tangier during George Washington's tenure as president. In 1821, Slimane of Morocco gifted an urban mansion to the United States, now the Tangier American Legation Museum, which thus became the first piece of foreign property owned by the US government.

In 1828, Great Britain blockaded the port in retaliation for piracy. As part of its ongoing conquest of neighbouring Algeria, France declared the Franco-Moroccan War over Moroccan tolerance of Emir Abdelkader. Tangier was bombarded by the French under the Prince of Joinville on 6 August 1844. The Tangier fortifications sustained little damaged and were later repaired by English engineers. The French victory in the Battle of Isly near the disputed border ended the conflict on French terms.

The Italian revolutionary Giuseppe Garibaldi lived in Tangier during his exile starting in 1849, following the fall of the revolutionary Roman Republic. Tangier's geographic location made it a centre of European diplomatic and commercial rivalry in Morocco in the late 19th and early 20th centuries. During the American Civil War, a minor diplomatic crisis known as the Tangier Difficulty took place when the American consul ordered the arrest of two Confederates in the city, an action that was protested by the local European community. By the 1870s, it was the site of every foreign embassy and consul in Morocco but only held about 400 foreign residents out of a total population of around 20,000. The city increasingly came under French influence, and it was here in 1905 that Kaiser Wilhelm II triggered an international crisis that almost led to war between his country and France by pronouncing himself in favour of Morocco's continued independence, with an eye to its future acquisition by the German Empire. The Algeciras Conference which ended the standoff left Tangier's police training and customs collections in international hands but Britain's strong support of its "Entente Cordiale" with France ended German hopes concerning Morocco.

Improved harbour facilities were completed in 1907, with an inner and outer mole. In 1905 the first Moroccan newspaper, Lisan al-Maghrib ("The Voice of Morocco"), was established in Tangier on the order of Sultan Abdelaziz, partly with the aim of counteracting the views expressed by al-Sa'adah, an Arabic newspaper established in 1904 or 1905 by the French embassy in the city. The newspaper was founded and managed on behalf of the government by two Lebanese journalists, Faraj and Artur Numur. It later became more notorious for publishing reformist ideas and views critical of the sultan. In the years leading up to the First World War, Tangier had a population of about 40,000, about half Muslim, a quarter Jewish, and a quarter European Christians. Of the Europeans, about three-quarters were artisans and labourers from Spain.

In 1912, the Treaty of Fes established the French protectorate over most of Morocco and Spanish rule in the country's far south and north, but left Tangier's status for further determination. Hubert Lyautey persuaded the last Sultan of independent Morocco, Abdelhafid, to abdicate in exchange for the receipt of a massive pension. Abdelhafid planned to live in Tangier where he used part of his pension to build an opulent mansion west of the old city, the Abdelhafid Palace, completed in 1914. The complex was later purchased by Italian interests and is now also known as the "Palace of Italian Institutions" (French: palais des institutions italiennes). The standard-gauge Franco-Spanish Tangier–Fez Railway (French: Compagnie Franco-Espagnole du Tanger–Fès) was constructed from 1919 to 1927.

The Tangier International Zone was created under the joint administration of France, Spain and the United Kingdom by an international convention signed in Paris on 18 December 1923. Ratifications were exchanged in Paris on 14 May 1924, and the convention was registered in League of Nations Treaty Series on 13 September 1924. It was amended by a protocol of July 1928 to elevate the status of Italy, an idea put forth by Sir Austen Chamberlain of Great Britain. The European powers' creation of the statute of Tangier promoted the formation of a cosmopolitan society where Muslims, Christians, and Jews lived together with reciprocal respect and tolerance. A town where men and women, with many different political and ideological tendencies, found refuge, including Spaniards from the right or from the left, Jews fleeing Nazi Germany and Moroccan dissidents. With very liberal economic and fiscal laws, Tangier became – in an international environment full of restrictions, prohibitions and monopolies – a tax haven with absolute freedom of trade. The International Zone of Tangier had a 373 km^{2} (144 sq mi) area and, by the mid-1930s, a population of about 50,000 inhabitants: 30,000 Muslims, 12,000 Jews, and 8,000-odd Europeans, with a decreasing proportion of working class Spaniards. At its peak in the 1940s, there were 22,000 Jews in Tangier.

Spanish troops occupied Tangier on 14 June 1940, the same day Paris fell to the Germans after the Battle of France. During the Spanish occupation of Tangier (1940-1945) Spanish nationalists demanded the annexation of Tangier "Tánger español", but the Franco regime publicly considered the occupation a temporary wartime measure. A diplomatic dispute between Britain and Spain over the latter's abolition of the city's international institutions in November 1940 led to a further guarantee of British rights and a Spanish promise not to fortify the area. The territory was restored to its pre-war status on 11 October 1945.

=== Moroccan independence ===
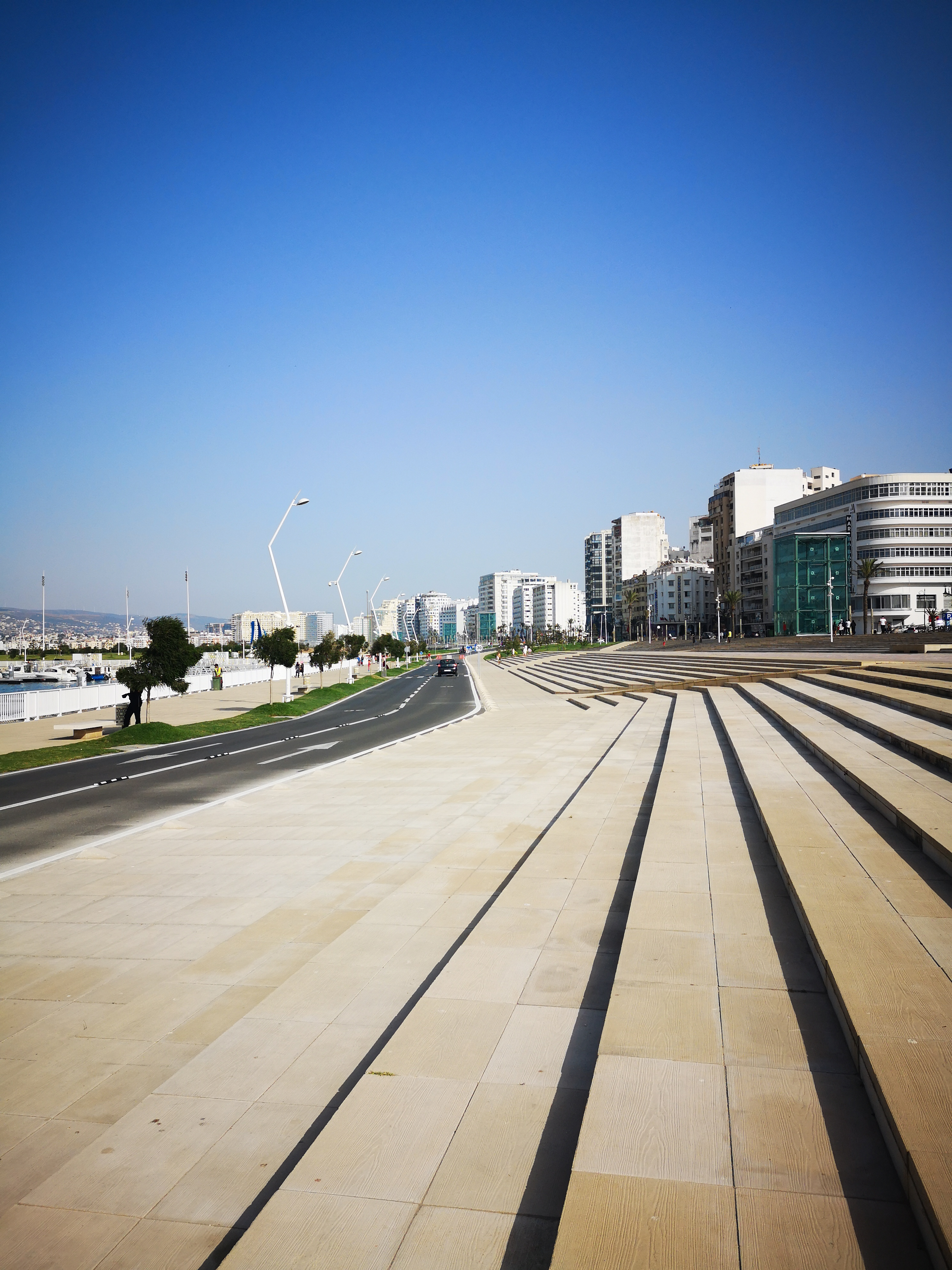
Marina Bay area

The Tangier International Zone played an important role in the campaign for Moroccan independence. Because of its legal status as an international zone, activists were able to meet in Tangier, relatively protected from the French and Spanish authorities. In 1951, the National Front was created in Tangier, a pact between Morocco's four nationalist parties to coordinate their campaign to achieve Moroccan independence.

In July 1952 the protecting powers met at Rabat to discuss the International Zone's future, agreeing to abolish it. Tangier joined with the rest of Morocco following the restoration of full sovereignty in 1956. At the time of the handover, Tangier had a population of around 40,000 Muslims; 31,000 Christians; and 15,000 Jews.

=== Historical gallery ===
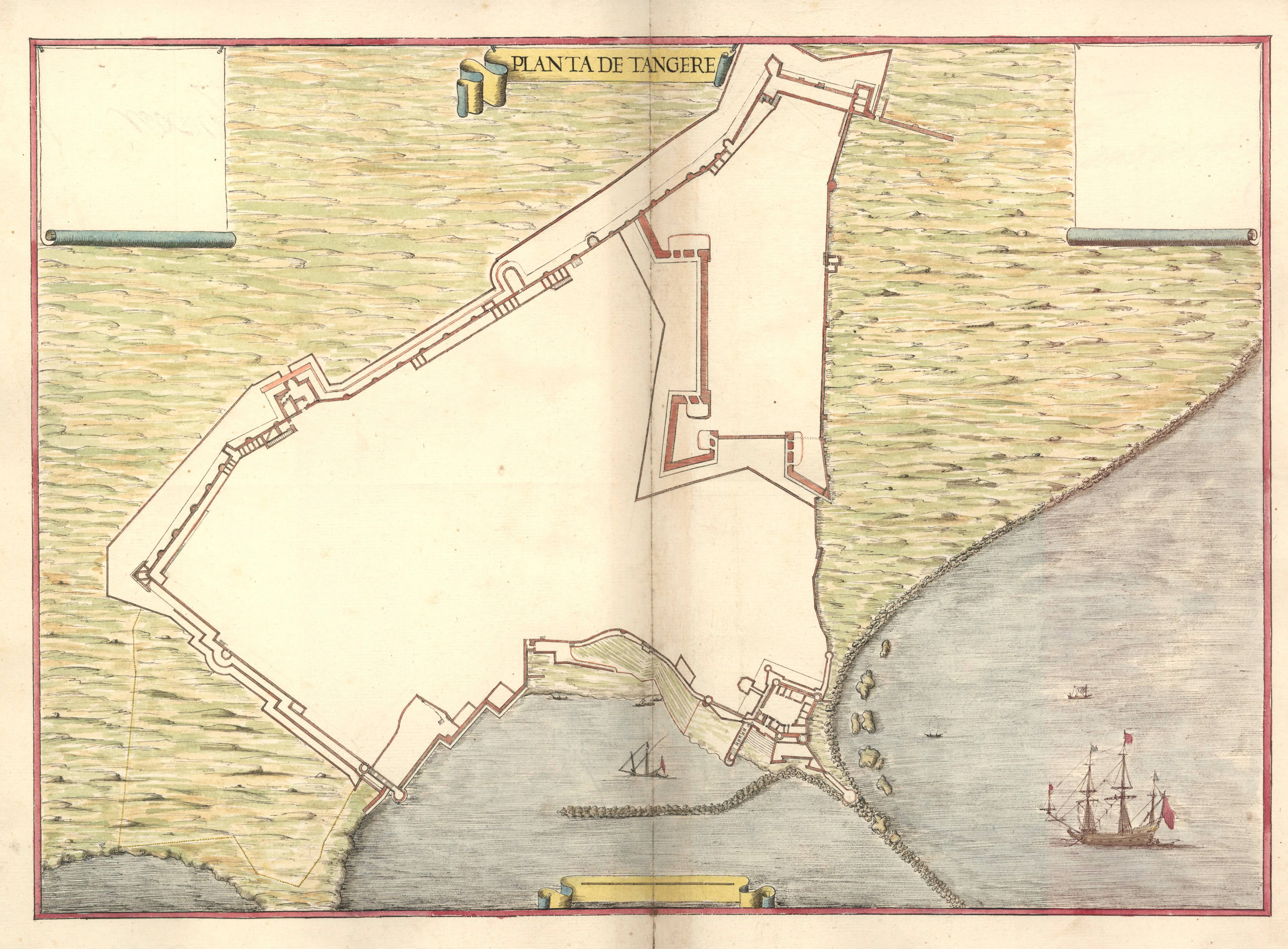
Leonardo de Ferrari's plan of the Portuguese fortifications at Tangier, circa 1655

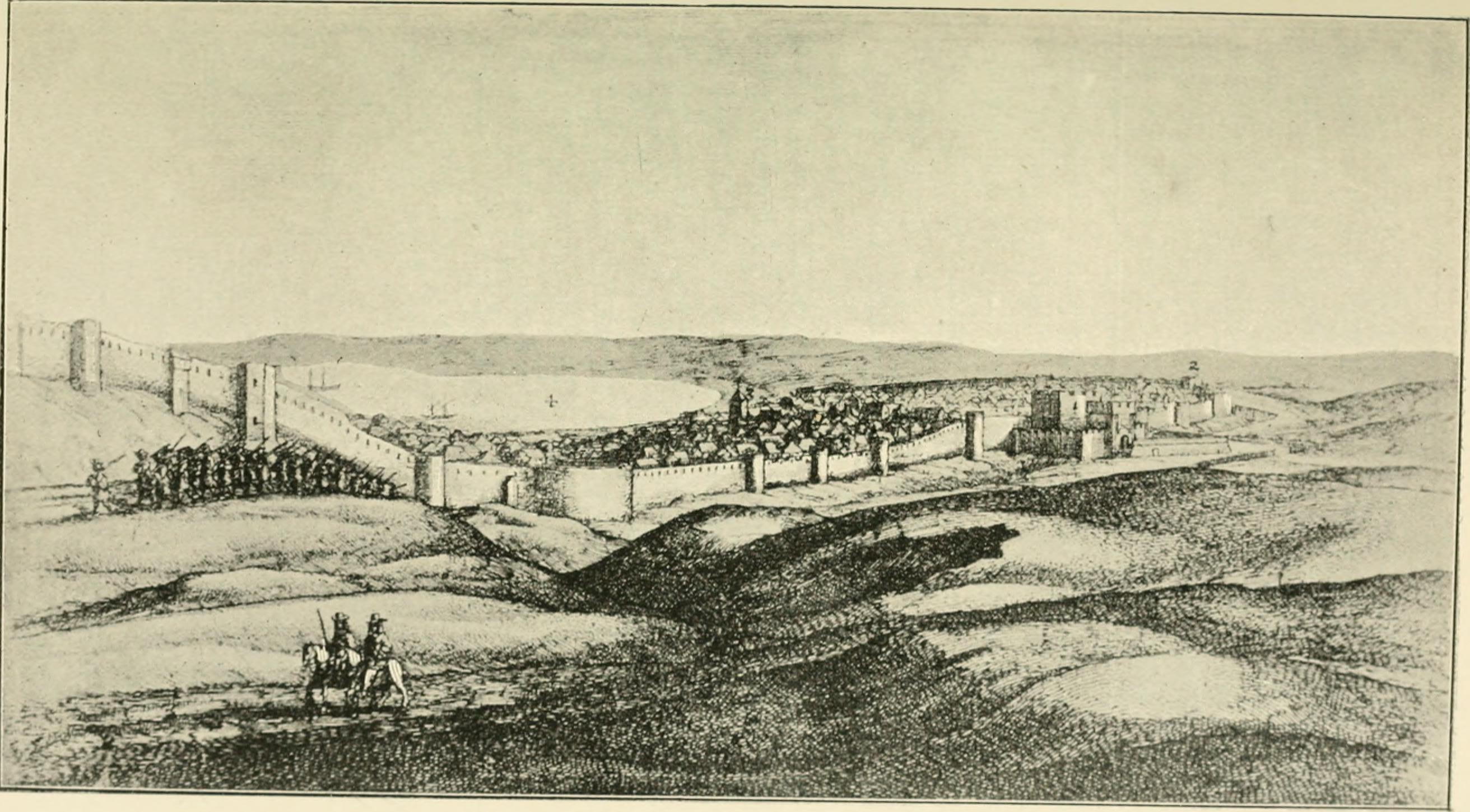
Hollar's landscape of Tanger at the beginning of its English occupation

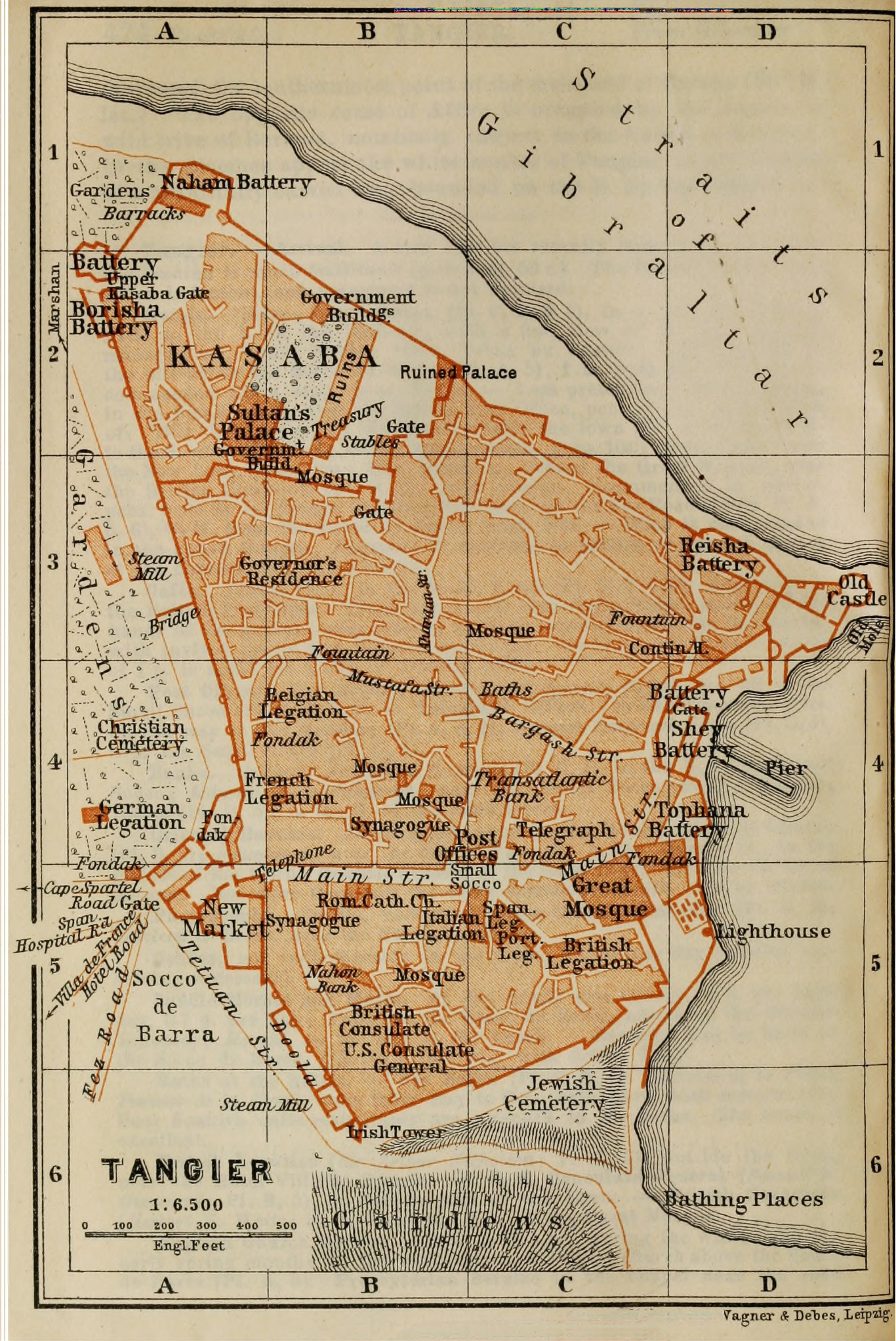
Tangier circa 1901

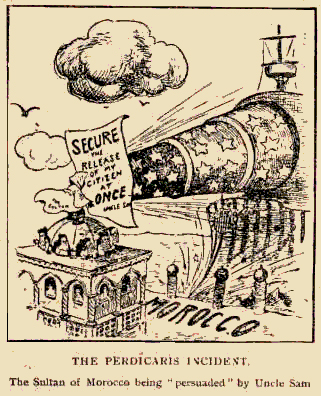
A 1904 editorial cartoon illustrating the gunboat diplomacy involved in resolving the Perdicaris Incident

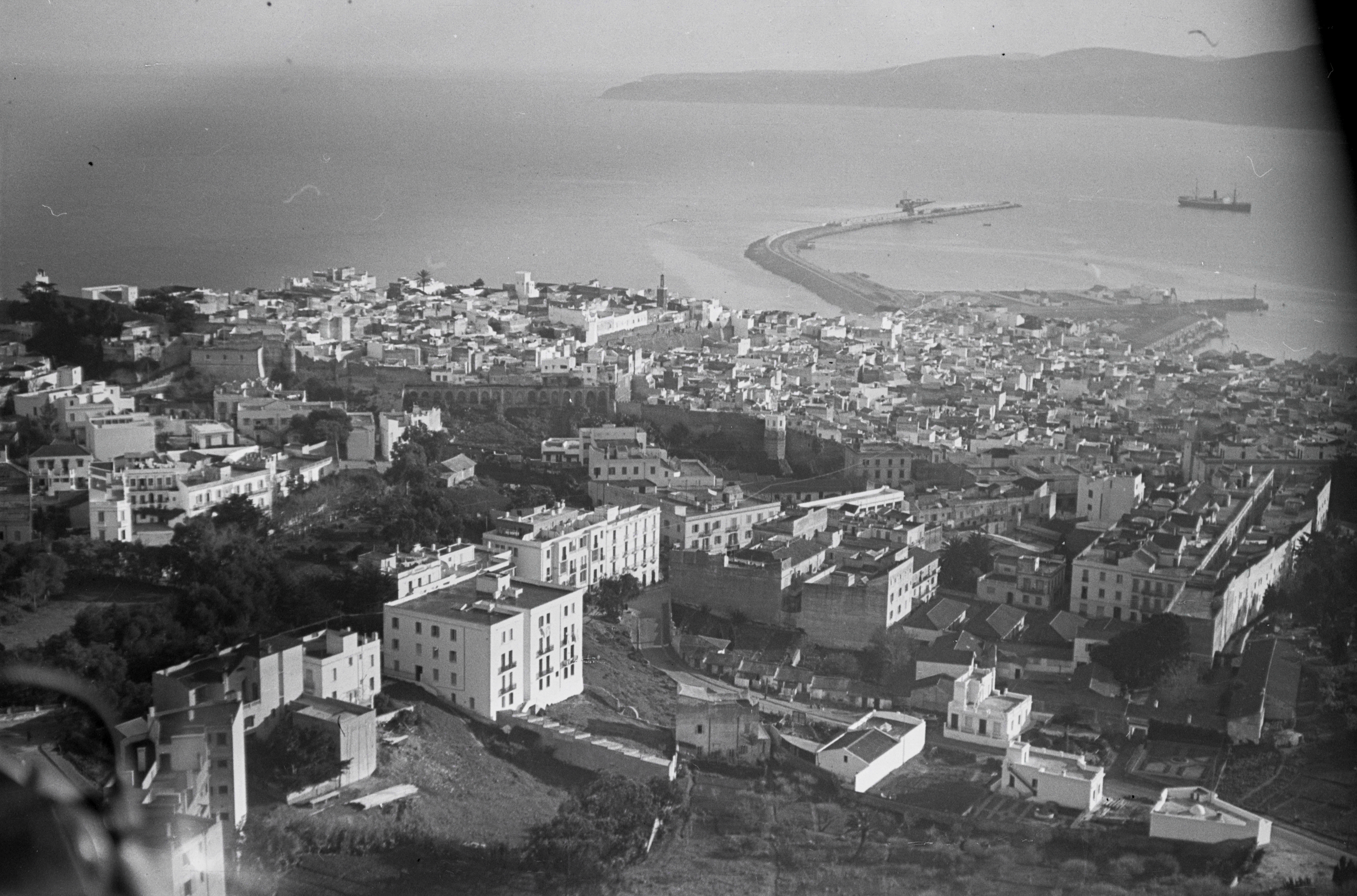
Aerial view of Tangier in 1932

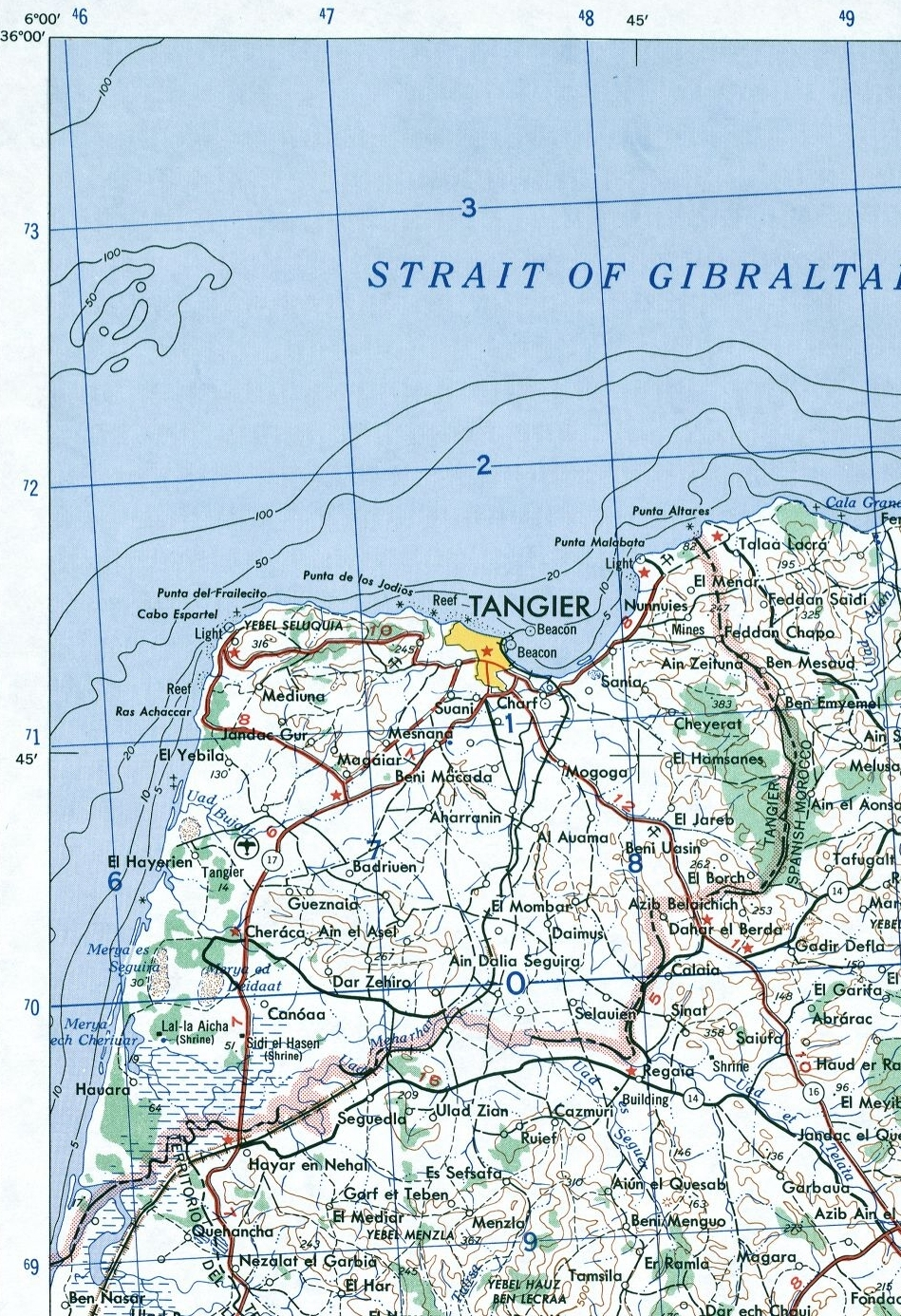
Tangier and its mid-20th-century Tangier International Zone

== Geography ==
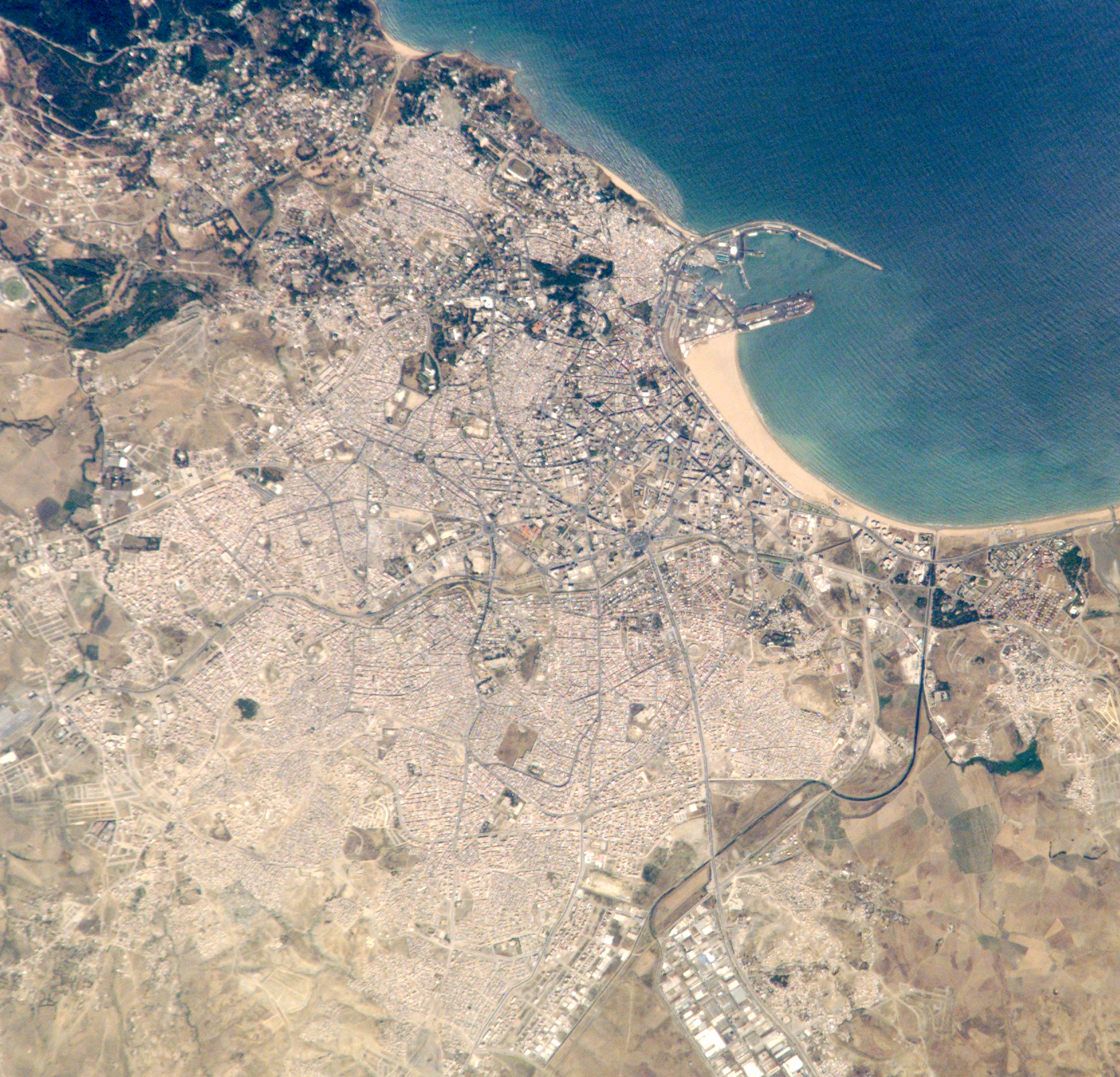
Tangier from space (2005)

Central Tangier lies about 23 km (14 mi) east of Cape Spartel, the southern half of the Strait of Gibraltar. It nestles between two hills at the northwest end of the Bay of Tangier, which historically formed the best natural harbour anywhere on the Moroccan coast before the increasing size of ships required anchorage to be made further and further from shore. The shape of the gradually-rising underlying terrain creates the effect of the city as an amphitheatre, with the commercial district in the middle. The western hill (French: La Montagne) is the site of the city's citadel or kasbah. The eastern hill forms Cape Malabata, sometimes proposed as the point for a strait crossing. (Years of studies have, however, made no real progress thus far.)

The Marshan is a plateau about 1,189 metres (3,900 ft) long spreading west of downtown along the sea.

=== Climate ===
Tangier has a mediterranean climate (Köppen Csa) with heavier rainfall than most parts of North Africa and nearby areas on the Iberian Peninsula owing to its exposed location. The prevailing winds blow from the sea and have kept the site generally healthy even in earlier times with much poorer sanitation. The summers are relatively hot and sunny and the winters are wet and mild. Frost is rare, although a new low of −4.2 °C (24.4 °F) was recorded in January 2005. A record high temperature of 43.5 °C (110.3 °F) was recorded on 1 August 2003.

Climate data for Tangier (Tangier Airport) 1961–1990, extremes 1940–now
Month	Jan	Feb	Mar	Apr	May	Jun	Jul	Aug	Sep	Oct	Nov	Dec	Year
Record high °C (°F)	26.4 (79.5)	27.5 (81.5)	31.6 (88.9)	34.8 (94.6)	36.5 (97.7)	39.6 (103.3)	43.1 (109.6)	43.5 (110.3)	39.5 (103.1)	36.2 (97.2)	30.3 (86.5)	26.0 (78.8)	43.5 (110.3)
Mean maximum °C (°F)	19.4 (66.9)	20.8 (69.4)	22.9 (73.2)	24.9 (76.8)	27.9 (82.2)	31.8 (89.2)	33.2 (91.8)	33.6 (92.5)	30.8 (87.4)	27.9 (82.2)	24.0 (75.2)	20.2 (68.4)	34.32 (93.78)
Mean daily maximum °C (°F)	16.2 (61.2)	16.8 (62.2)	17.9 (64.2)	19.2 (66.6)	21.9 (71.4)	24.9 (76.8)	28.3 (82.9)	28.6 (83.5)	27.3 (81.1)	23.7 (74.7)	19.6 (67.3)	17.0 (62.6)	21.8 (71.2)
Daily mean °C (°F)	12.5 (54.5)	13.1 (55.6)	14.0 (57.2)	15.2 (59.4)	17.7 (63.9)	20.6 (69.1)	23.5 (74.3)	23.9 (75.0)	22.8 (73.0)	19.7 (67.5)	15.9 (60.6)	13.3 (55.9)	17.7 (63.9)
Mean daily minimum °C (°F)	8.8 (47.8)	9.4 (48.9)	10.1 (50.2)	11.2 (52.2)	13.4 (56.1)	16.2 (61.2)	18.7 (65.7)	19.1 (66.4)	18.3 (64.9)	15.6 (60.1)	12.2 (54.0)	9.7 (49.5)	13.6 (56.5)
Mean minimum °C (°F)	5.9 (42.6)	7.0 (44.6)	7.9 (46.2)	9.9 (49.8)	12.0 (53.6)	15.3 (59.5)	16.9 (62.4)	17.8 (64.0)	15.8 (60.4)	13.0 (55.4)	9.1 (48.4)	7.2 (45.0)	4.45 (40.01)
Record low °C (°F)	−4.2 (24.4)	−1.1 (30.0)	0.0 (32.0)	2.9 (37.2)	2.9 (37.2)	7.7 (45.9)	11.1 (52.0)	12.2 (54.0)	10.5 (50.9)	7.1 (44.8)	2.0 (35.6)	−0.5 (31.1)	−4.2 (24.4)
Average precipitation mm (inches)	103.5 (4.07)	98.7 (3.89)	71.8 (2.83)	62.2 (2.45)	37.3 (1.47)	13.9 (0.55)	2.1 (0.08)	2.5 (0.10)	14.9 (0.59)	65.1 (2.56)	134.6 (5.30)	129.3 (5.09)	735.9 (28.97)
Average snowfall cm (inches)	0.30 (0.12)	0.0 (0.0)	0.0 (0.0)	0.0 (0.0)	0.0 (0.0)	0.0 (0.0)	0.0 (0.0)	0.0 (0.0)	0.0 (0.0)	0.0 (0.0)	0.0 (0.0)	0.10 (0.04)	0.4 (0.16)
Average precipitation days	11.2	11.4	10.1	9.3	6.1	3.7	0.8	0.8	3.1	8.0	11.1	12.0	87.6
Average snowy days	0.1	0.0	0.0	0.0	0.0	0.0	0.0	0.0	0.0	0.0	0.0	0.05	0.15
Average relative humidity (%)	80	81	78	78	76	74	70	72	73	76	79	81	76
Average dew point °C (°F)	8.8 (47.8)	8.8 (47.8)	9.8 (49.6)	10.6 (51.1)	12.2 (54.0)	15.2 (59.4)	17.7 (63.9)	18.1 (64.6)	17.3 (63.1)	14.5 (58.1)	11.5 (52.7)	9.5 (49.1)	12.8 (55.1)
Mean monthly sunshine hours	182.9	173.6	235.6	258.0	310.0	327.0	356.5	344.1	279.0	241.8	189.0	179.8	3,077.3
Percentage possible sunshine	57.9	56.4	63.9	66.2	71.9	75.2	80.4	82.8	75.0	69.0	60.0	58.0	69.0
Average ultraviolet index	2	4	6	7	8	10	10	9	7	5	3	2	6
Source: National Oceanic and Atmospheric Administration (NOAA) and other weather data sources

== Administration and politics ==
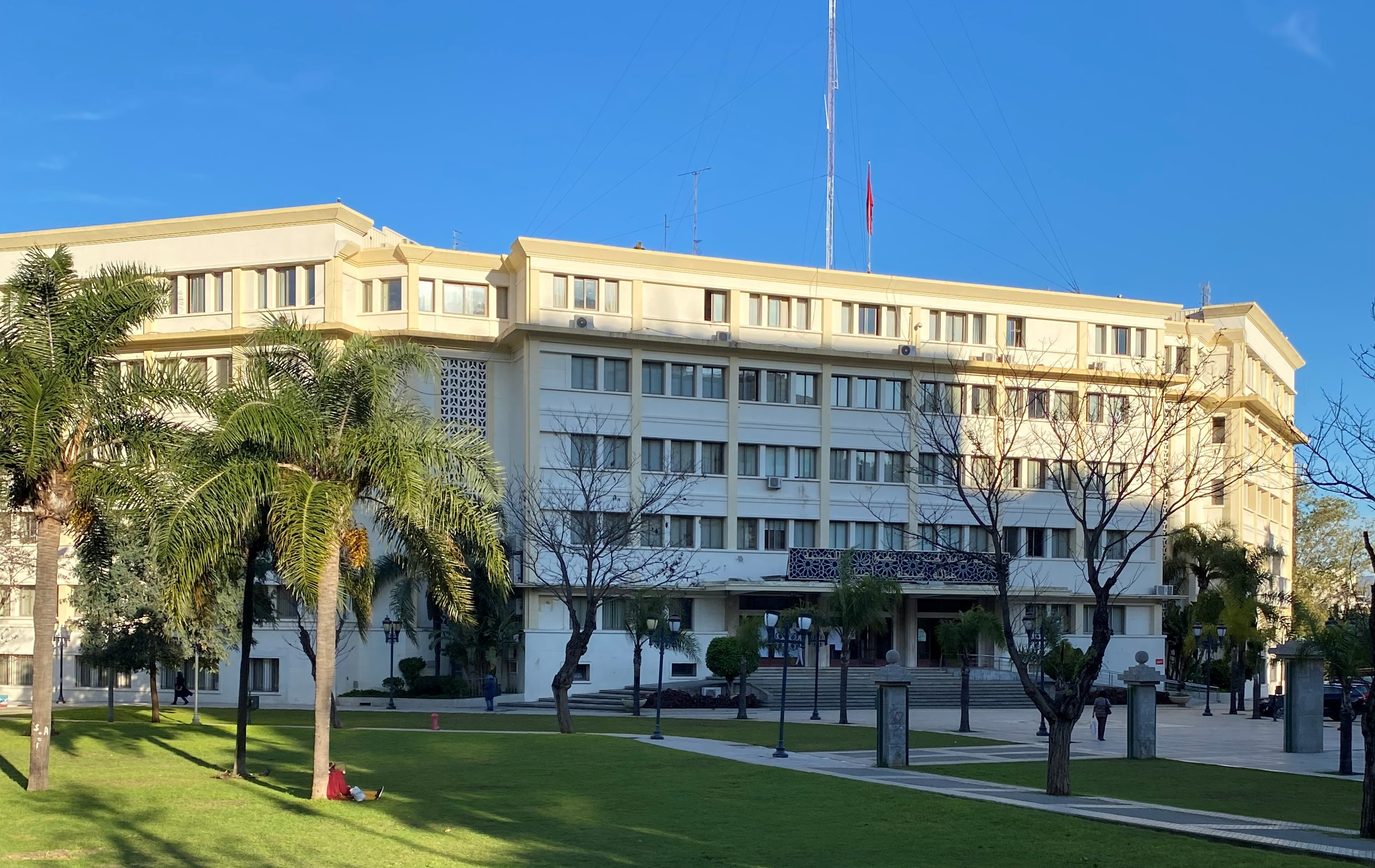
Wilaya administration building, former seat of the Tangier International Zone

Tangier proper is a Commune of Tangier-Assilah Prefecture, it serves as the seat for both the Prefecture and the Tangier-Tetouan-Al Hoceima region.

The current mayor of Tangier is Mounir Laymouri of the Authenticity and Modernity Party.

The current governor of Tangier-Assilah Prefecture and Wali of the Tangier-Tetouan-Al Hoceima region is Younes Tazi.

The Commune is divided into four local districts (arrondissements):

Name	Geographic code	Type	Households	Population (2024)	Foreign population	Moroccan population
Mghogha	01.511.01.05	Arrondissement	70,679	252,656	806	251,850
Souani	01.511.01.06	Arrondissement	33,489	111,772	652	111,120
Bni Makada	01.511.01.03	Arrondissement	150,816	567,465	927	566,538
Médina	01.511.01.07	Arrondissement	107,078	343,535	4,531	339,004

In addition to the Commune of Tangier, suburbs of Tangier include the communes of Gueznaia, Hjar Ennhal, Dar Chaoui, Al Manzla and Zinat.

== Economy ==
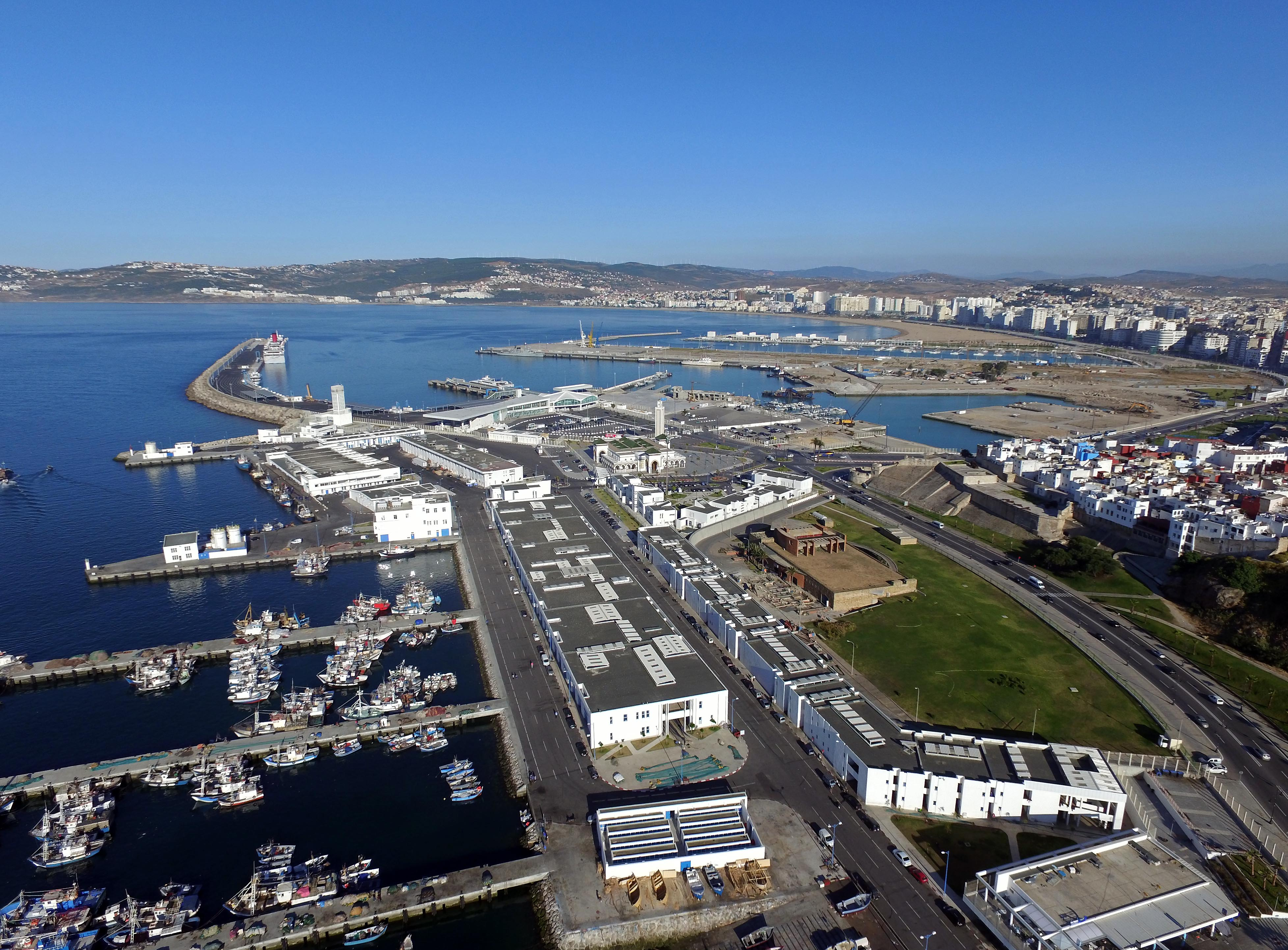
Port of the city of Tangier, not to be confused with Tanger Med

'Technopark' building in Tangier

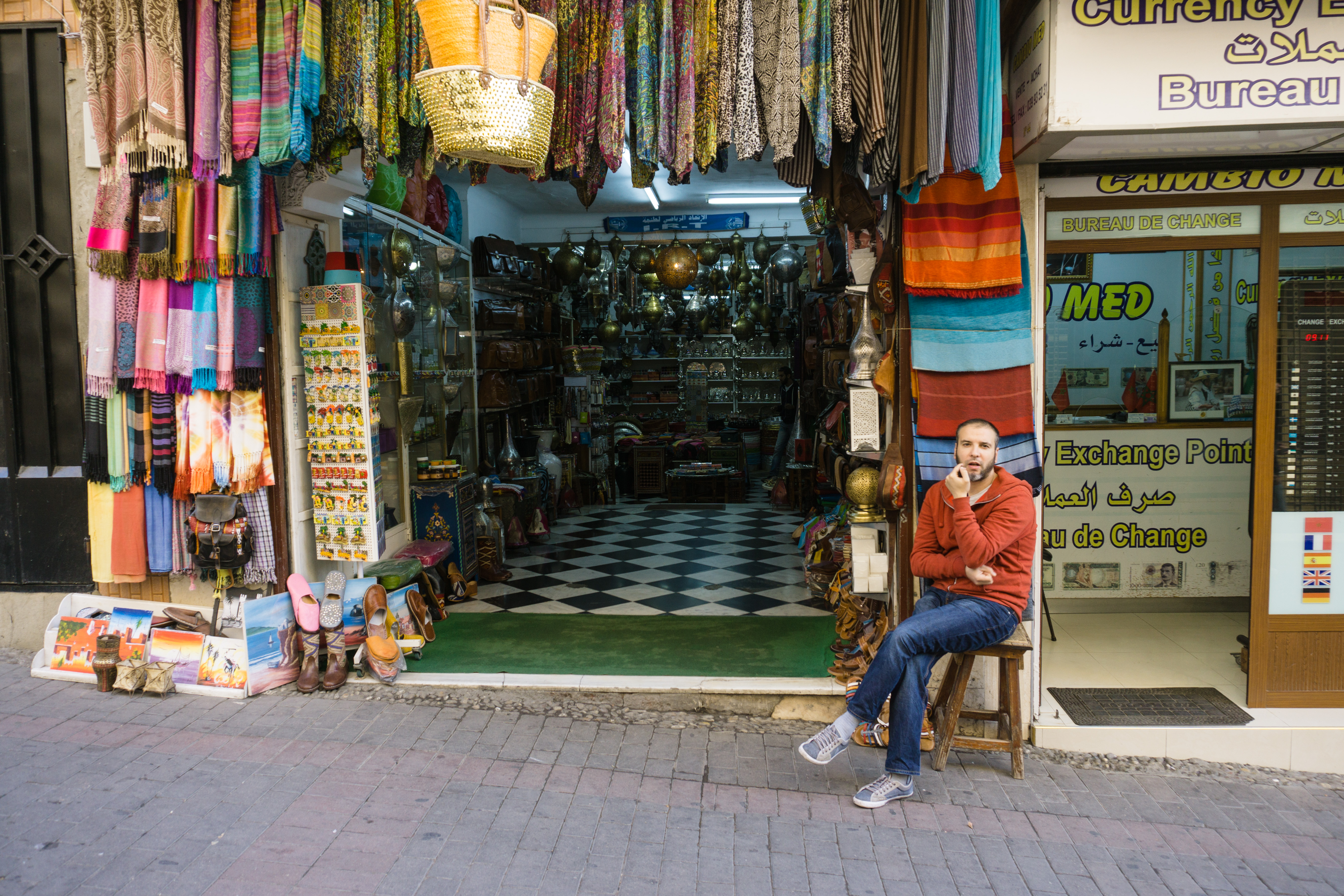
Small businesses in Tangier's Medina ("Old City")

Tangier is Morocco's second most important industrial centre after Casablanca. The industrial sectors are diversified: textile, chemical, mechanical, metallurgical and naval. Currently, the city has four industrial parks of which two have the status of free economic zone (see Tangier Free Zone).

Tangier's economy relies heavily on tourism. In the 1960s and '70s, Tangier formed part of the hippie trail. It became less popular and tourist attractions became run-down as cheap flights made central Moroccan cities like Marrakesh more accessible to European tourists; crime rose and a somewhat dangerous reputation drove more tourists away. Since 2010, however, King Mohammed VI has made a point of restoring the city's shipping and tourist facilities and improving its industrial base. Among other improvements, the beach was cleaned and lined with new cafes and clubs; the new commercial port means cruise ships no longer unload beside cargo containers.

Seaside resorts have been increasing with projects funded by foreign investments. Real estate and construction companies have been investing heavily in tourist infrastructures. A bay delimiting the city centre extends for more than 7 km (4 mi). The years 2007 and 2008 were particularly important for the city because of the completion of large construction projects; these include the Tangier-Mediterranean port ("Tanger-Med") and its industrial parks, a 45,000-seat sports stadium, an expanded business district, and renovated tourist infrastructure.

Tanger-Med, a new port 40 km (25 mi) outside Tangier proper, began construction in 2004 and became functional in 2007. Its site plays a key role in connecting maritime regions, as it is in a very critical position on the Strait of Gibraltar, which passes between Europe and Africa. The makeup of the new port is 85% transhipment 15% for domestic import and export activities. The port is distinguished by its size, infrastructure, and efficiency in managing the flow of ships. Tanger-Med has linked Morocco to Europe's freight industry. It has also helped connect Morocco to countries in the Mediterranean, Africa, and America. The port has allowed Tangier to become a more globalised city with new international opportunities that will help facilitate economic growth. The construction and operation of the port aimed to create 120,000 new jobs, 20,000 at the port and 100,000 resulting from growing economic activity.

Agriculture in the area of Tangier is tertiary and mainly cereal. The city is chiefly famed for tangerines, a kind of mandarin orange hybrid first grown in the orchards then once south of the medina, but it was never commonly exported. As early as 1900, local consumption had already outstripped supply and required imports from Tetuan and elsewhere. Mass farming of tangerines instead began in Florida in the United States, where the first tree was introduced at Palatka by a Major Atway sometime before 1843.

Artisanal trade in the medina ("Old City") specialises mainly in leather working, handicrafts made from wood and silver, traditional clothing, and Moroccan-style shoes.

The city has grown quickly due to rural exodus from other smaller cities and villages. The 2014 population is more than three-times larger than 32 years ago (850.000 inhabitants in 2014 vs. 250,000 in 1982). This phenomenon has resulted in the appearance of peripheral suburban districts, mainly inhabited by poor people, that often lack sufficient infrastructure.

In 2023 Tangier hosted the Connect route development forum.

== Notable landmarks ==
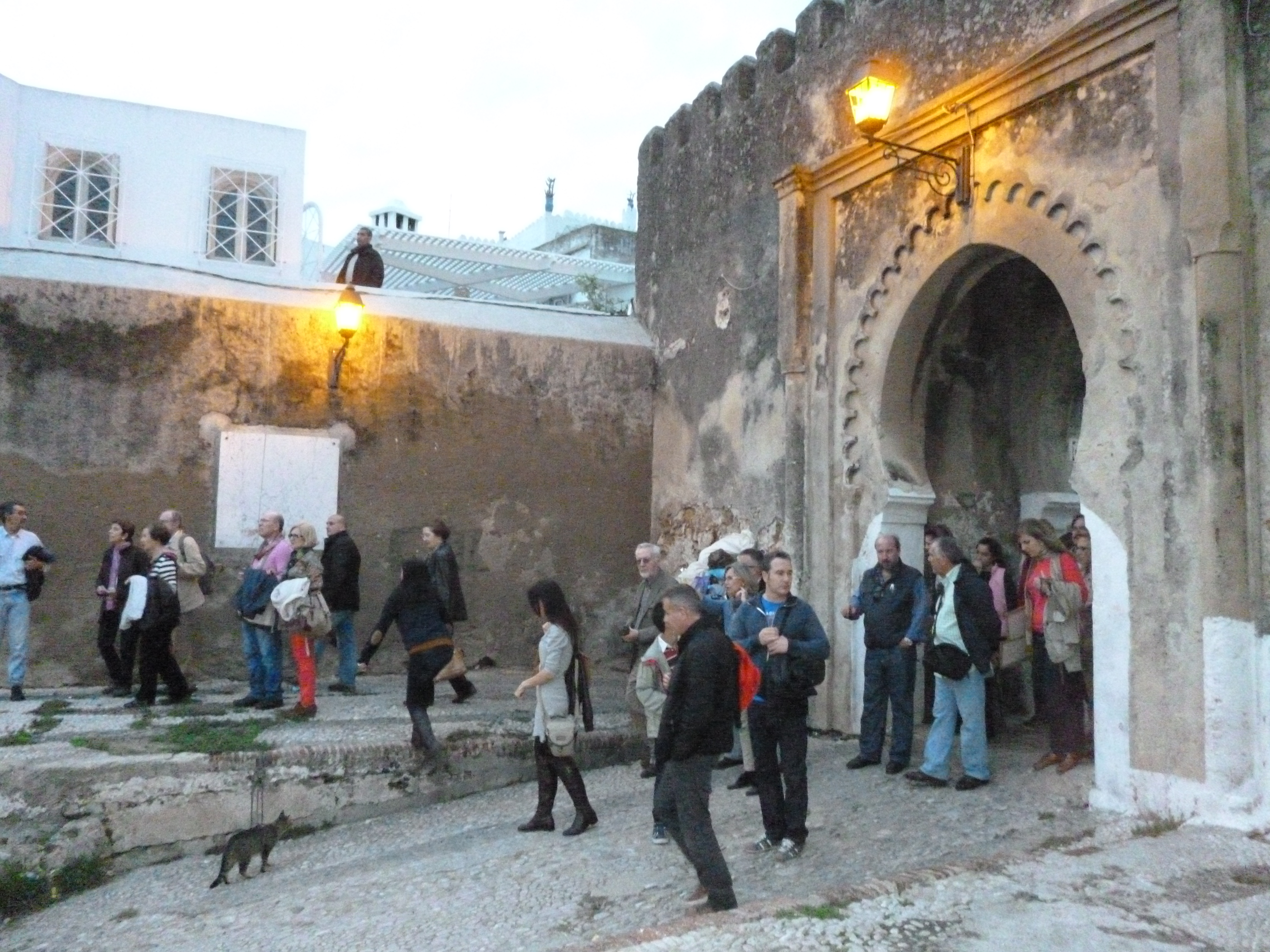
Gate of the Kasabah

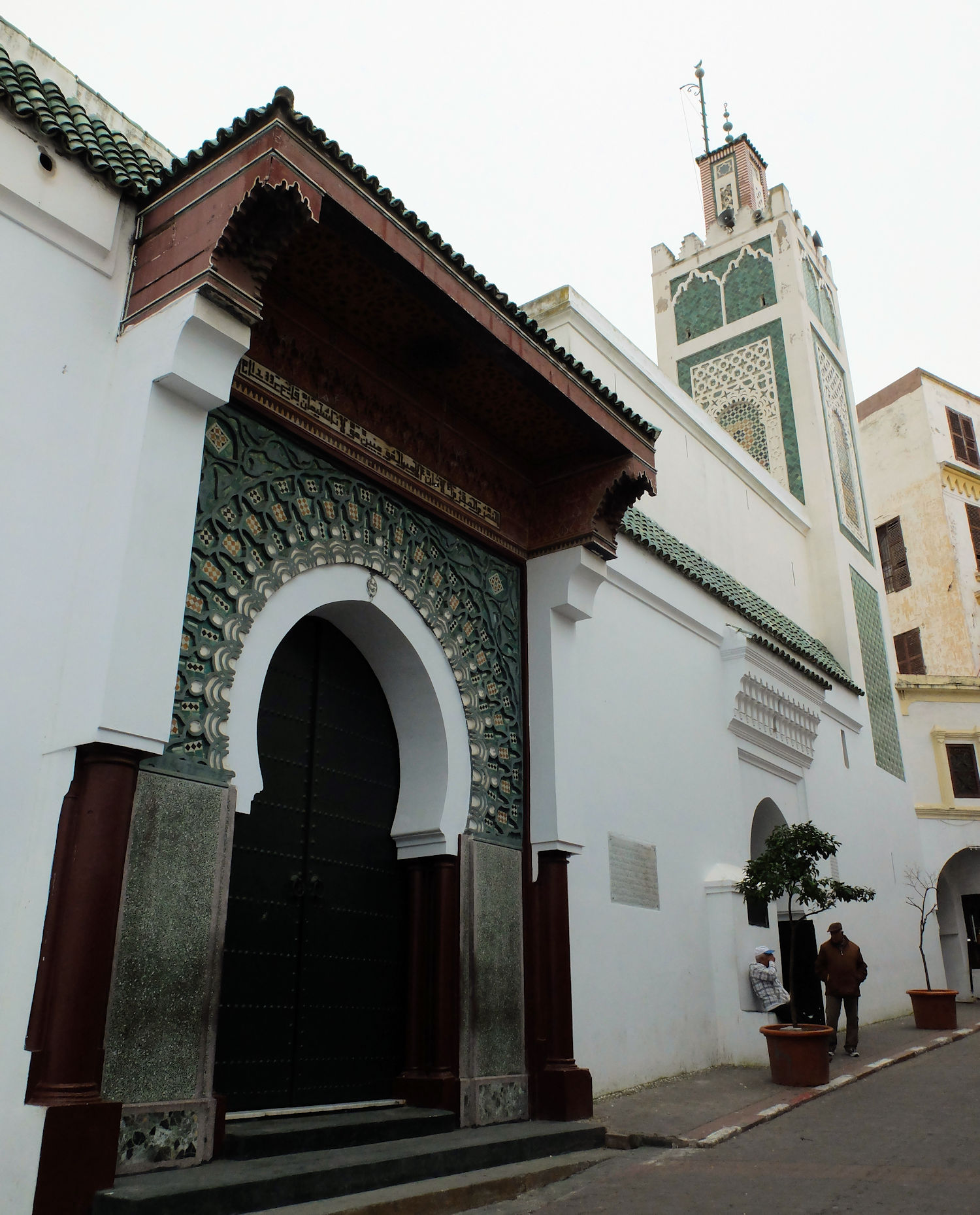
Portal of the Grand Mosque of Tangier

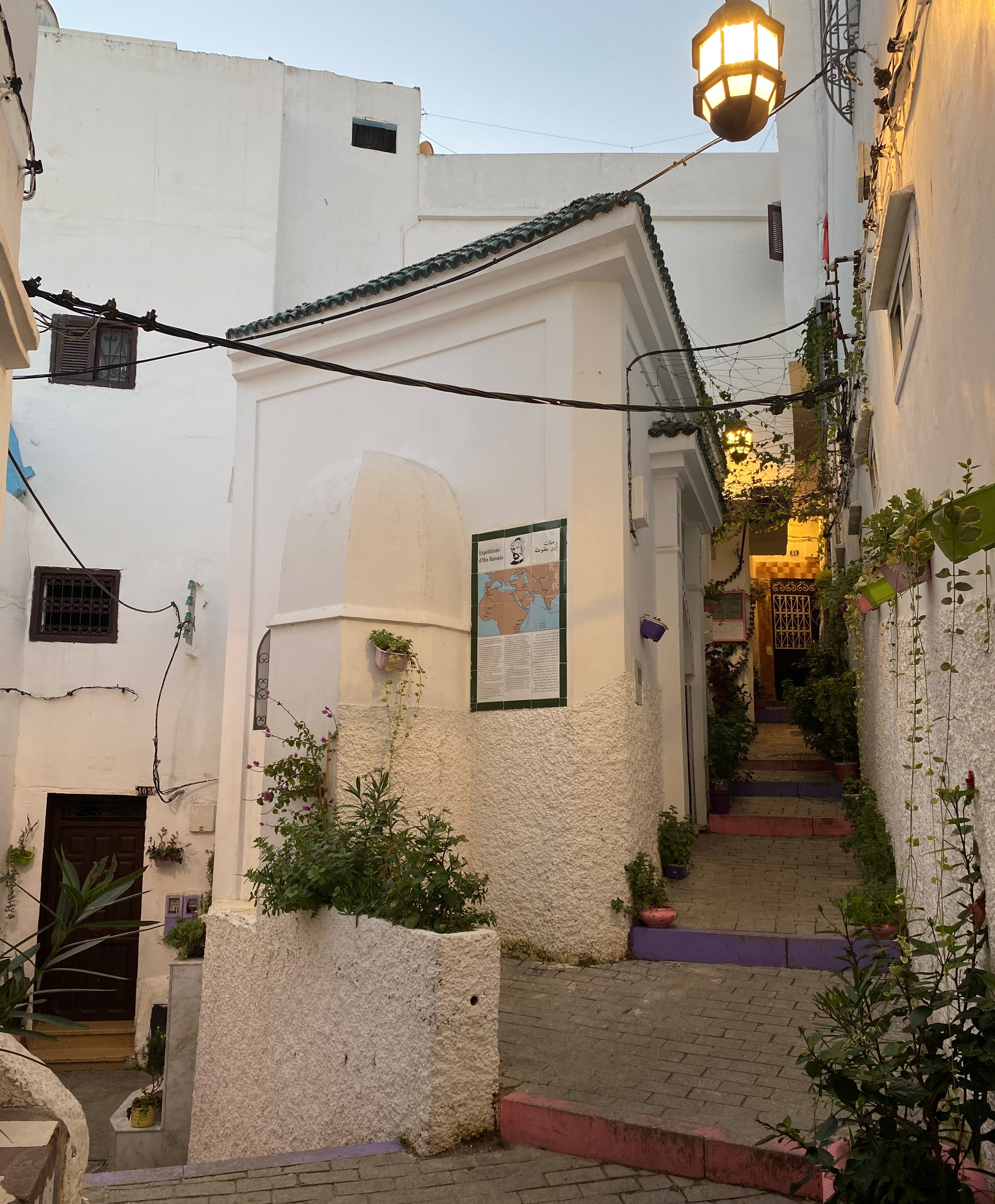
Mausoleum of Ibn Battuta

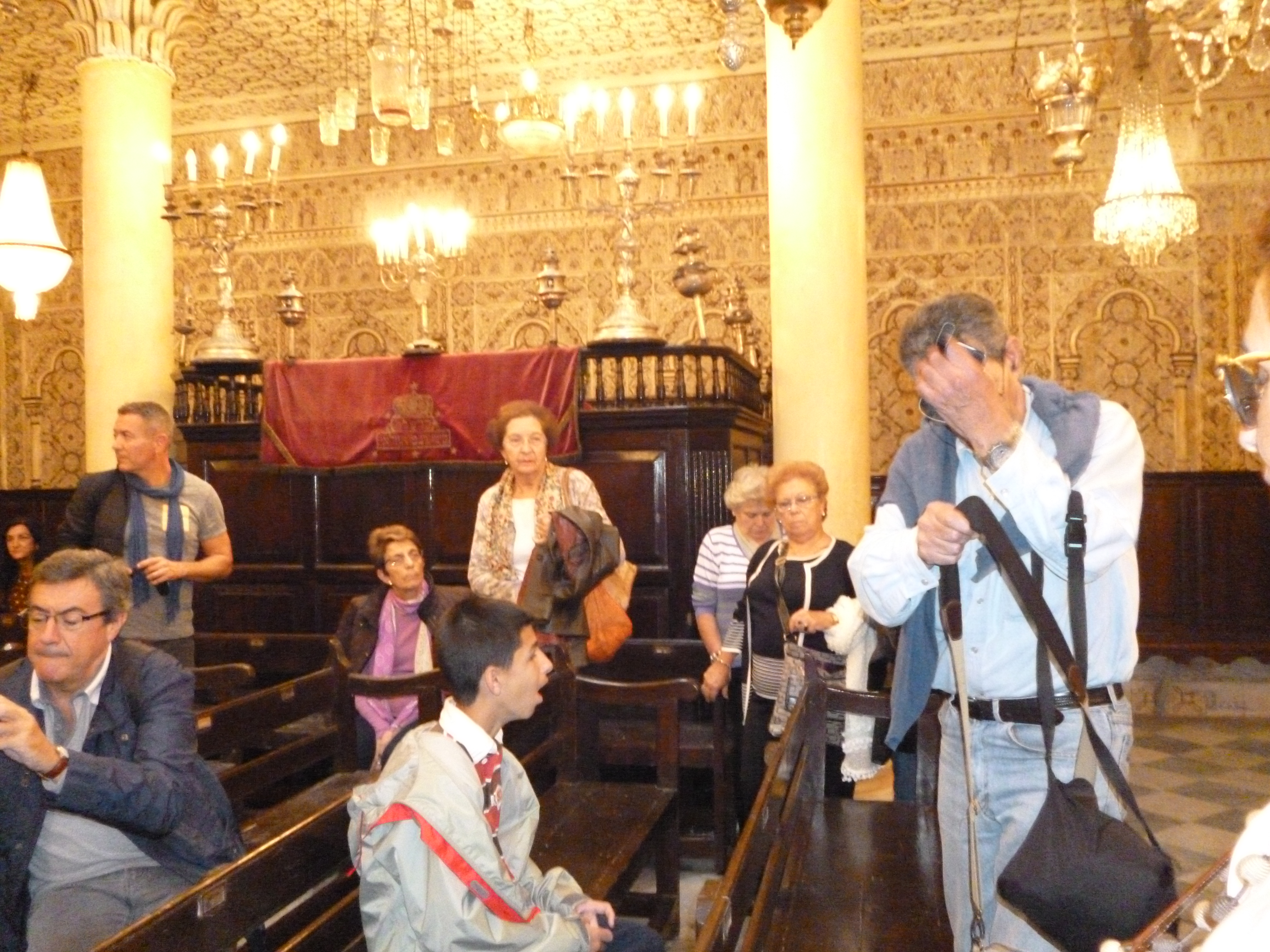
Interior of the Moshe Nahon Synagogue

The old town is still surrounded by the remains of what was once more than 1,829 metres (6,000 ft) of stone rampart. Most of it dates to the town's Portuguese occupation, with restoration work later undertaken at different times. Three major bastions were the Irish Tower (Bordj al-Naʿam), York Castle (Bordj dar al-Barud), and the Bordj al-Salam.

- Medina (old city)
  - Kasbah Palace, former residence of the governors of Tangier, built on the site of the former English Upper Castle, now Museum of Mediterranean Cultures
  - Kasbah Mosque
  - Purported tomb of Ibn Battuta
  - Petit Socco, central square of the lower (southern) section of the medina
  - Rue Es-Siaghine leading to the Petit Socco
  - Dar Niaba
  - Church of the Immaculate Conception
  - Grand Mosque of Tangier
  - Hotel Continental
  - Avraham Toledano Synagogue
  - Beit Yehuda Synagogue, preserved as Jewish Museum of Tangier
  - Moshe Nahon Synagogue
  - Rabbi Mordechai Bengio Synagogue, preserved as Fondation Lorin Museum
  - Former American Legation, the first American public property abroad and the only U.S. National Historic Landmark in a foreign country
  - Musée de Carmen-Macein
- Extra-muros downtown
  - Lalla Abla Mosque on the port
  - Grand Socco, former marketplace and central city square outside the old city walls
  - Mendoubia palace, now a museum of Moroccan resistance against colonialism, and its surrounding park on former cemeteries
  - Sidi Bou Abib Mosque
  - St Andrew's Church
  - Museum of Contemporary Art in the former British Consulate
  - Roman Catholic Cathedral of Tangier
  - Abdelhafid Palace
  - Mohammed V Mosque
  - French Consulate General at the start of Boulevard Pasteur
  - Moroccan Debt Administration building, now tourist office
  - Gran Teatro Cervantes
  - French Church of Tangier
  - New Palace of Arts and Cultures, is an architectural masterpiece that will play a central role in the 2024 International Jazz Day celebration.
- Marshan neighbourhood
  - Mendoub's Residence
  - Marshan Palace, Tangier
  - Stade de Marchan
  - Café Hafa
- Further outskirts
  - Cape Malabata
  - Plaza de Toros, Tangier's bullring
  - Charf Hill
  - Fondation pour la photographie Tanger
  - Perdicaris Park
  - Cape Spartel
  - Caves of Hercules

== Transport ==
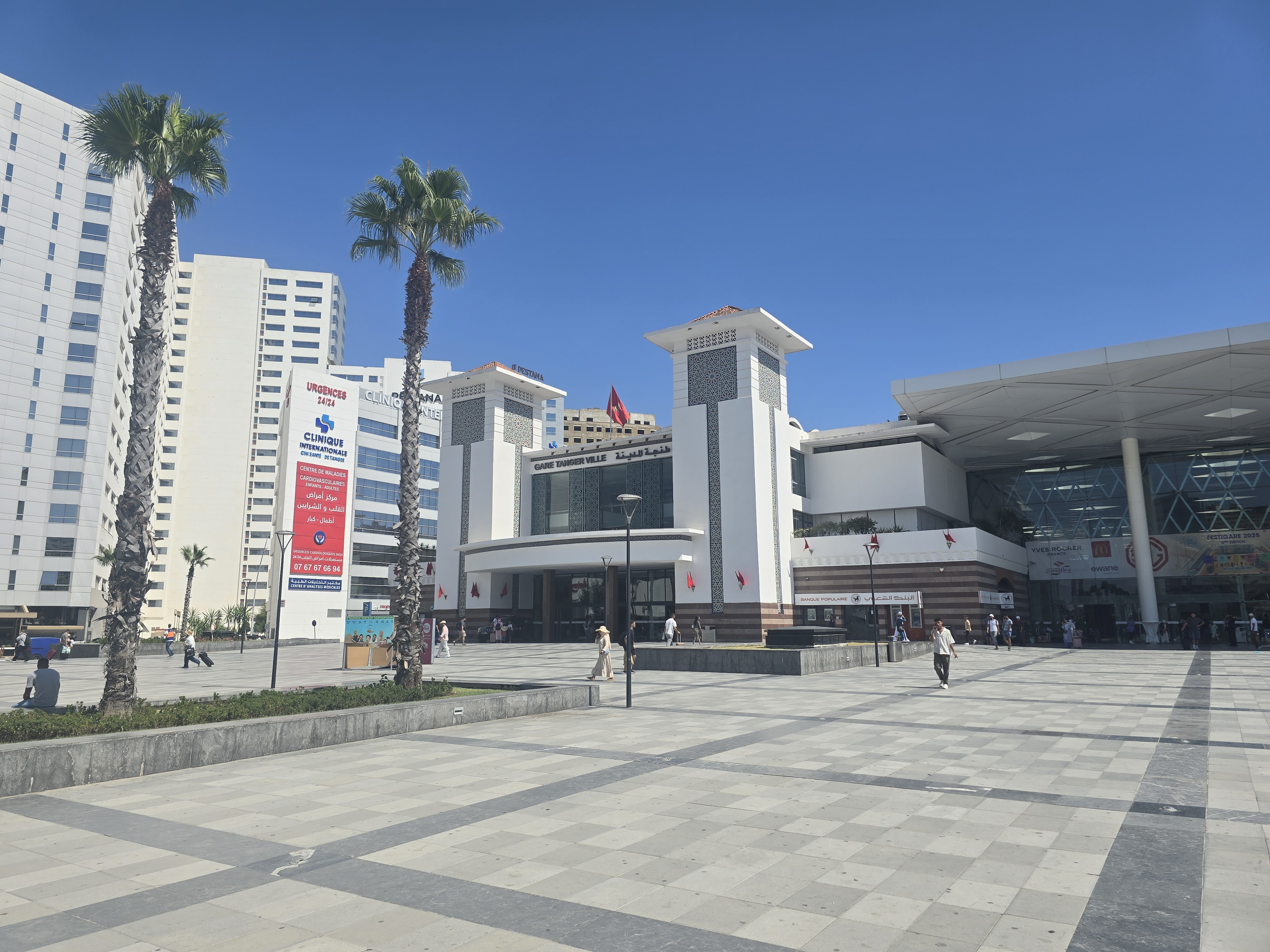
Tanger-Ville Railway station

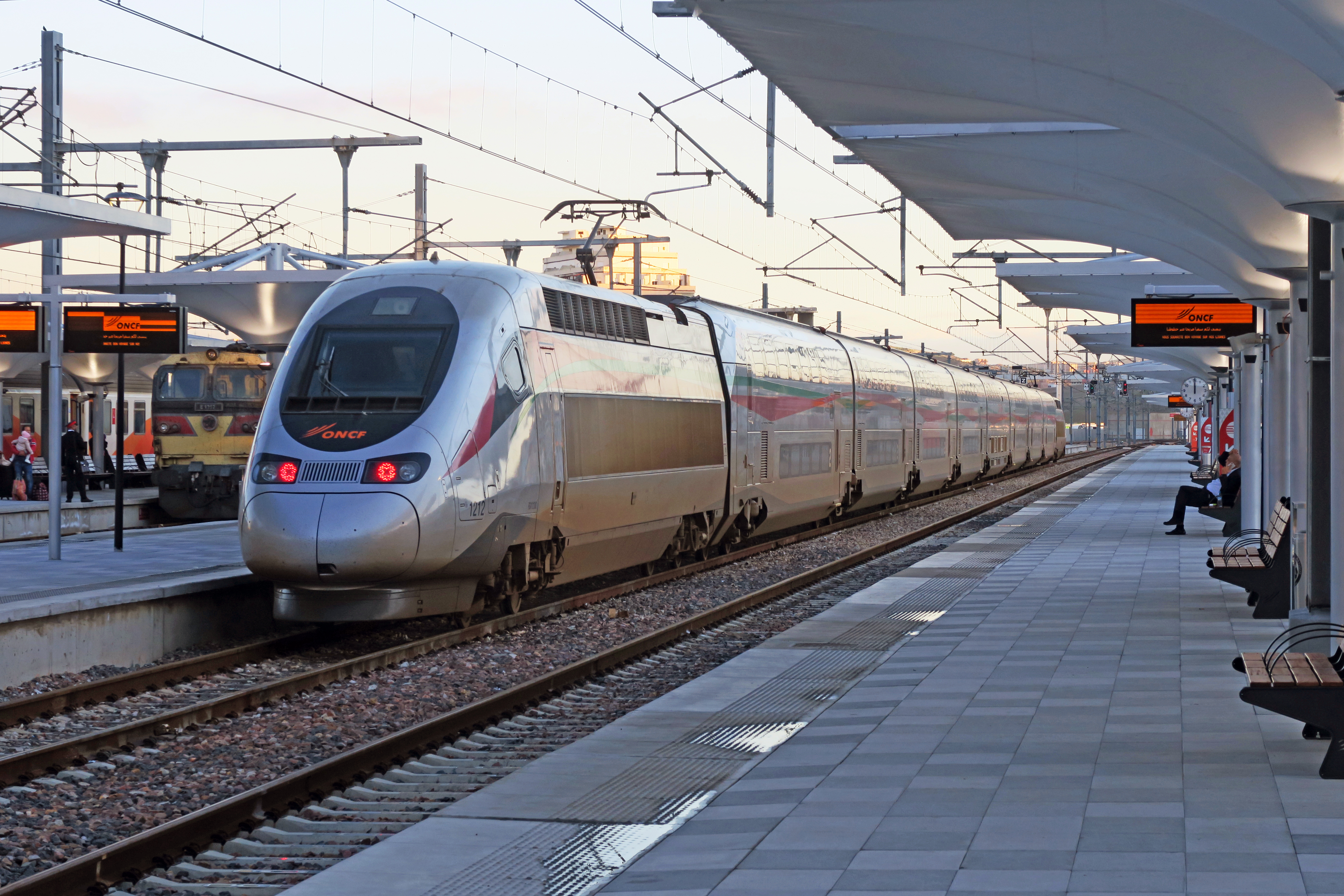
Al Boraq at the Tanger-Ville Railway Terminal

Railway lines connect Tanger-Ville railway station with Rabat, Casablanca and Marrakesh in the south, and with Fes and Oujda in the east. The service is operated by ONCF. In November 2018 Africa's first high-speed train, the Kenitra–Tangier high-speed rail line, was inaugurated, linking Tangier to Casablanca in 2 hours, 10 minutes. By 2020 improvements between Casablanca and Kenitra are planned to further reduce the journey to 1 hour and 30 minutes.

The Rabat–Tangier expressway connects Tangier to Fes via Rabat 250 km (155 mi), and Settat via Casablanca 330 km (205 mi) and Tanger-Med port. The Ibn Batouta International Airport (formerly known as Tangier-Boukhalef) is 15 km (9 mi) south-west of the city centre.

The new Tanger-Med port is managed by the Danish firm A. P. Moller–Maersk Group and will free up the old port for tourist and recreational development. Several ferries per day connect Tangier-Ville Ferry Terminal to Tarifa, and Tangier-Med to Algeciras. Two departures per week connect Tangier-Med directly to Gibraltar.

Tangier's Ibn Batouta International Airport and the rail tunnel will serve as the gateway to the Moroccan Riviera, the littoral area between Tangier and Oujda. Traditionally, the northern coast was a rural stronghold, with some of the best beaches on the Mediterranean. It is slated for rapid urban development. The Ibn Batouta International Airport has been modernised to accommodate more flights. The biggest airline at the airport is Royal Air Maroc.

== Education ==
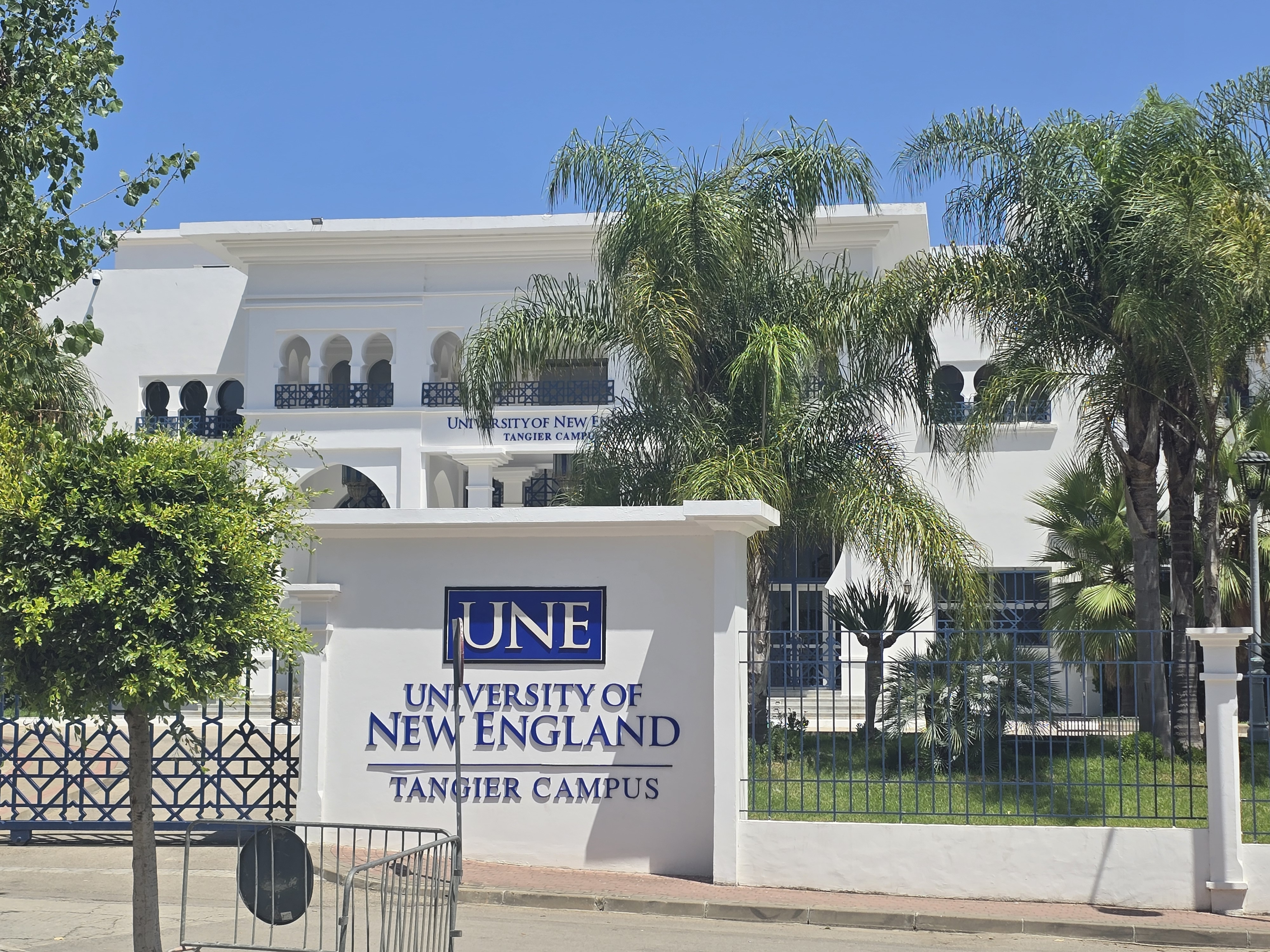
The University of New England's Tangier campus

Tangier offers four types of education systems: Arabic, French, Spanish and English. Each offers classes starting from pre-Kindergarten up to the 12th grade, as for German in the three last years of high school. The Baccalauréat, or high school diploma are the diplomas offered after clearing the 12 grades.

The main Public University serving the city is Abdelmalek Essaâdi University, which has colleges such as the École Nationale de Commerce et de Gestion (ENCG-T), one of the biggest business schools in the country as well as École Nationale des Sciences appliquées (ENSA-T), a rising engineering school for applied sciences, the university also holds many faculties specializing in Law, Economics, Science and the Humanities. it also has faculties and colleges providing technical training like the FST and the ISTA.

The Institut Supérieur International de Tourisme (ISIT), offers courses and diplomas ranging from business administration to hotel management. The institute is one of the most prestigious tourism schools in the country.

=== Primary education ===
There are more than a hundred Moroccan primary schools, dispersed across the city. Private and public schools, they offer education in Arabic, French and some school English until the 5th grade. Mathematics, Arts, Science Activities and nonreligious modules are commonly taught in the primary school.

=== International primary institutions ===
- American School of Tangier
- École Adrien Berchet (French primary school)
- Groupe scolaire Le Détroit (French school)
- Colegio Ramón y Cajal (Spanish primary school)
- English College of Tangier

=== International high schools ===
- American School of Tangier
- Lycée Regnault de Tanger (French high school)
- Groupe scolaire Le Détroit (French school)
- Instituto Español Severo Ochoa (Spanish high school)
- English College of Tangier
- Mohammed Fatih Turkish School of Tangier
- Tangier Anglo Moroccan School

== Culture ==
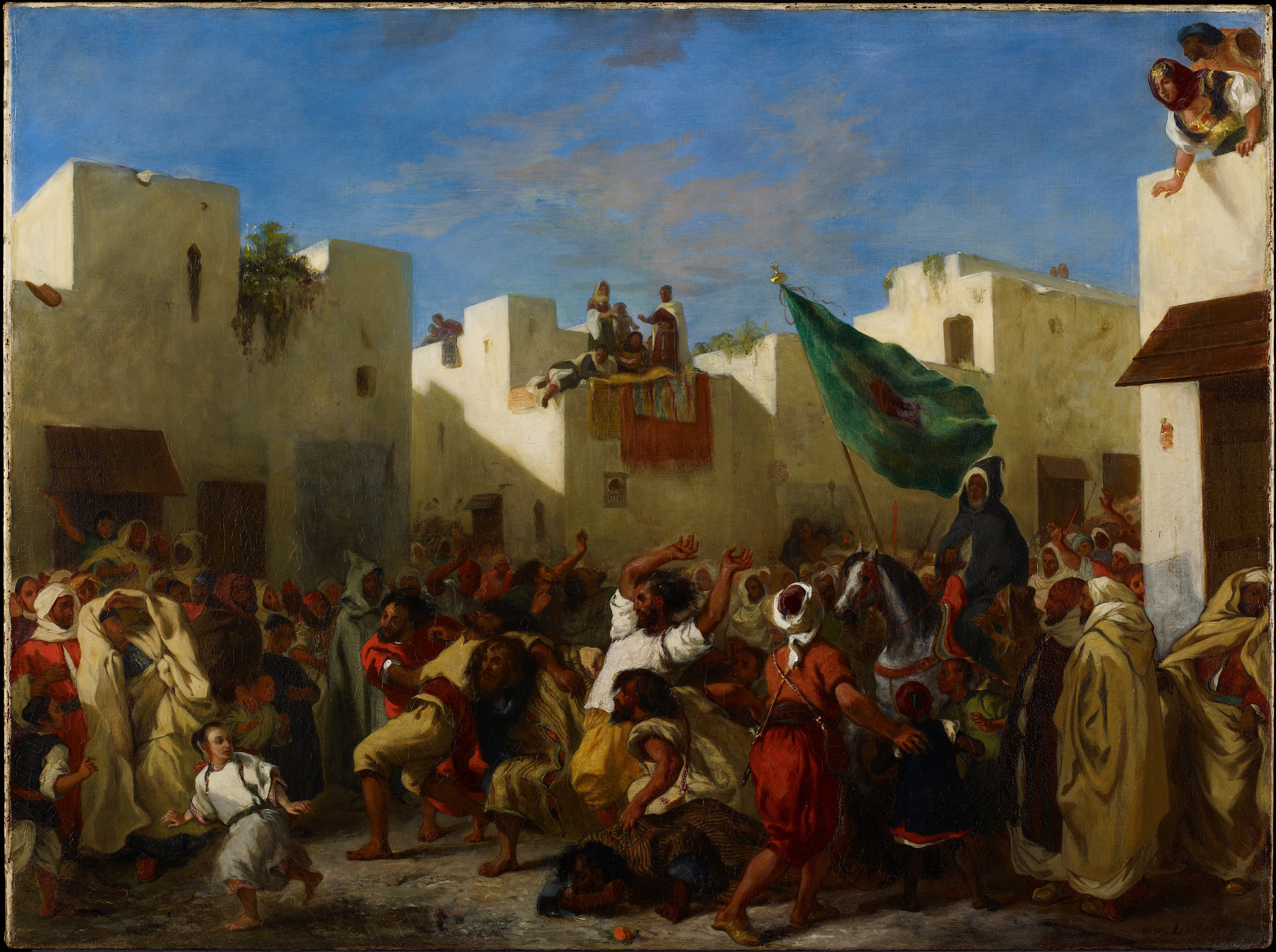
The Fanatics of Tangier (1830s) by Eugène Delacroix

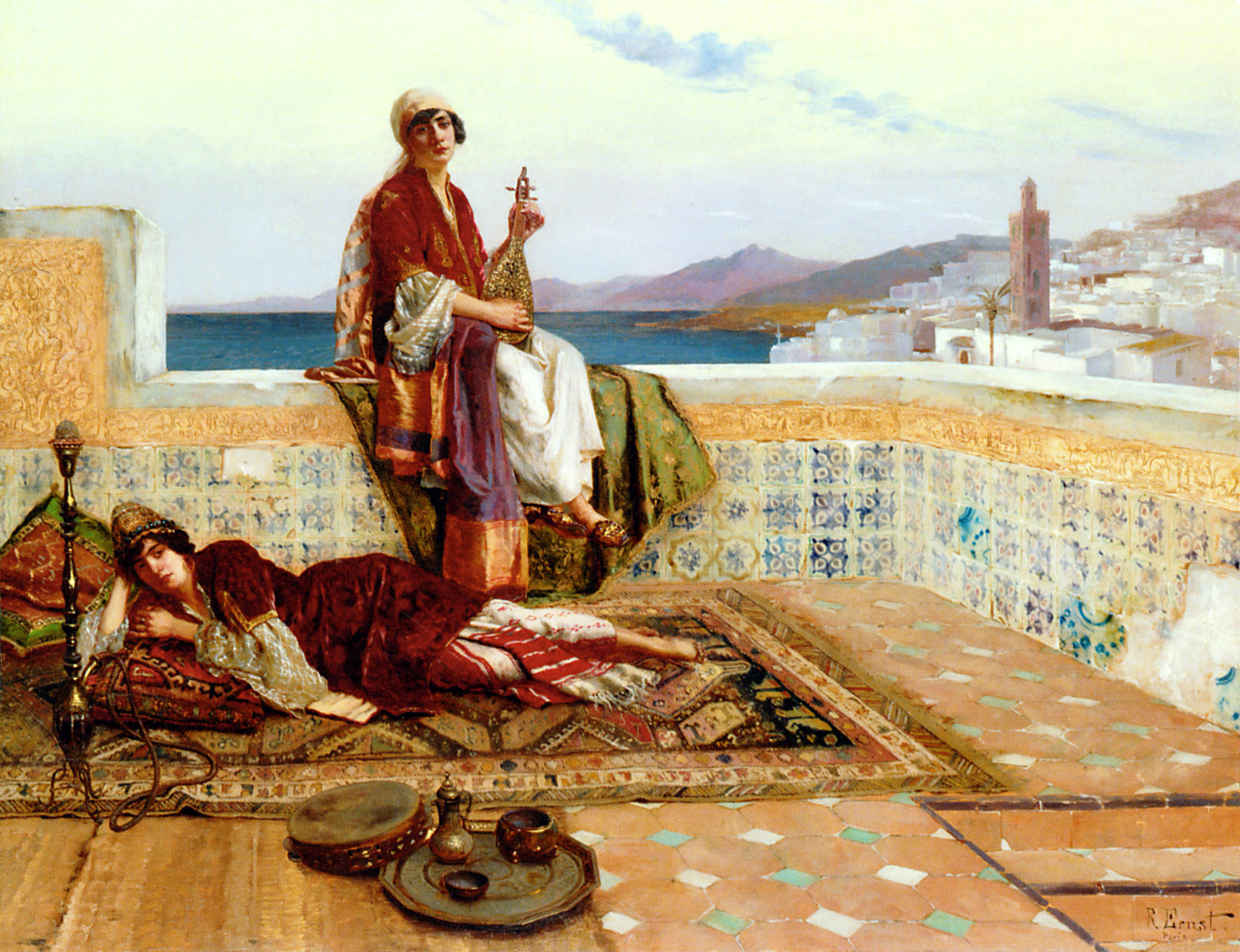
Young Ladies on a Terrace in Tangiers (1880s) by Rudolf Ernst

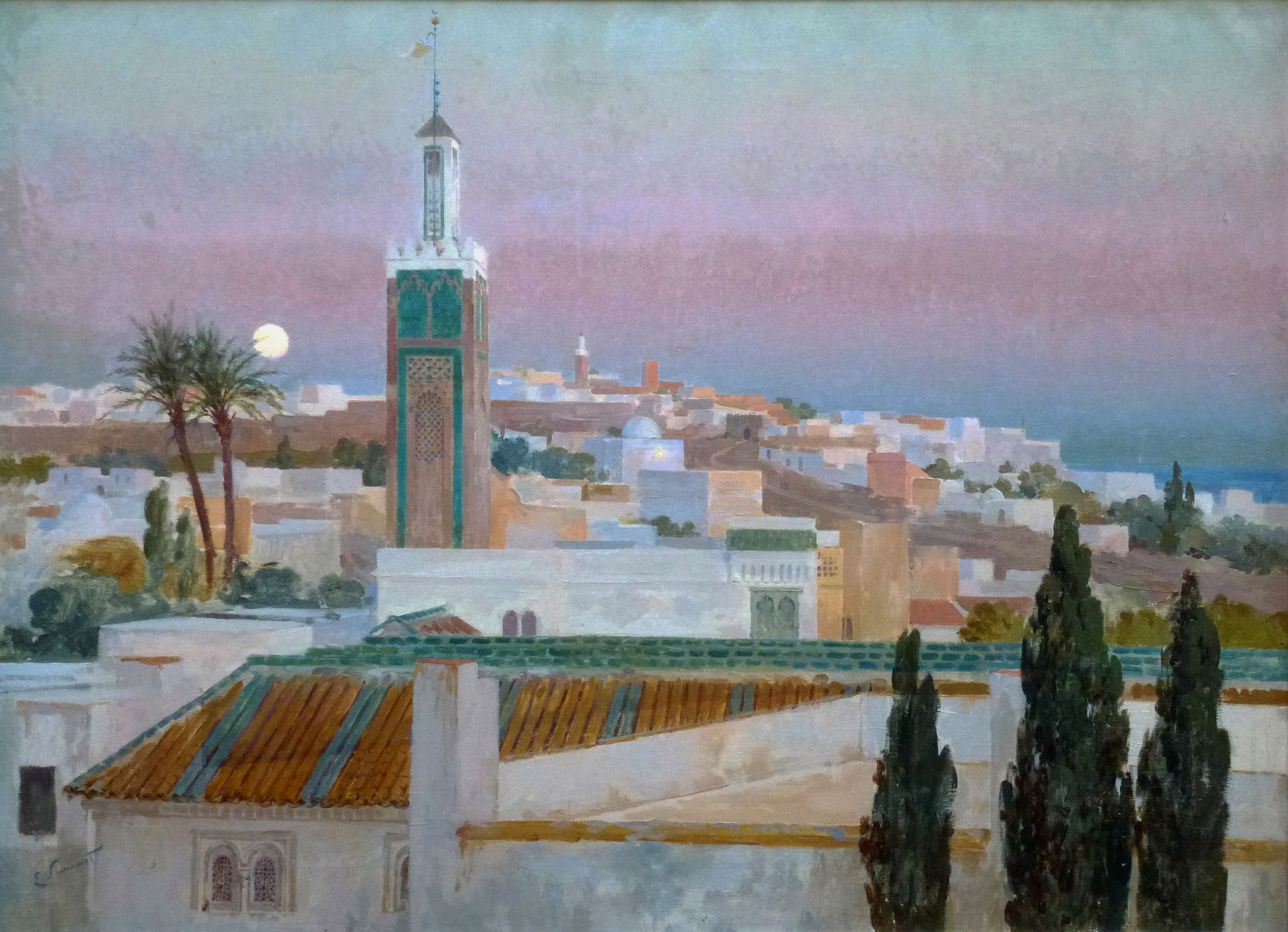
Dusk at Tangier (1914) by Enrique Simonet

Never in my life have I observed anything more bizarre than the first sight of Tangier. It is a tale out of the Thousand and One Nights... A prodigious mix of races and costumes...This whole world moves about with an activity that seems feverish.

— Eugène Delacroix, in a letter to Alexis de Tocqueville

When Count de Mornay traveled to Morocco in 1832 to establish a treaty supportive of the recent French annexation of Algeria, he took along the Romantic painter Eugène Delacroix. Delacroix not only reveled in the orientalism of the place; he also took it as a new and living model for his works on classical antiquity: "The Greeks and Romans are here at my door, in the Arabs who wrap themselves in a white blanket and look like Cato or Brutus..." He sketched and painted watercolours continuously, writing at the time "I am like a man in a dream, seeing things he fears will vanish from him." He returned to his sketches and memories of North Africa for the rest of his career, with 80 oil paintings like The Fanatics of Tangier and Women of Algiers becoming legendary and influential on artists such as Van Gogh, Gauguin, and Picasso. They were particularly struck by the quality of the light: to Cézanne, "All this luminous colour... seems... that it enters the eye like a glass of wine running into your gullet and it makes you drunk straight away". Tangier subsequently became an obligatory stop for artists seeking to experience the colours and light he spoke of for themselves—with varying results. Matisse made several sojourns in Tangier, always staying at the Grand Hotel Villa de France. "I have found landscapes in Morocco," he claimed, "exactly as they are described in Delacroix's paintings." His students in turn had their own; the Californian artist Richard Diebenkorn was directly influenced by the haunting colours and rhythmic patterns of Matisse's Morocco paintings.

The multicultural placement of Muslim, Christian and Jewish communities and the foreign immigrants attracted writer George Orwell, writer and composer Paul Bowles, playwright Tennessee Williams, the beat writers William S. Burroughs, Allen Ginsberg and Jack Kerouac, the painter Brion Gysin and the music group the Rolling Stones, who all lived in or visited Tangier during different periods of the 20th century.

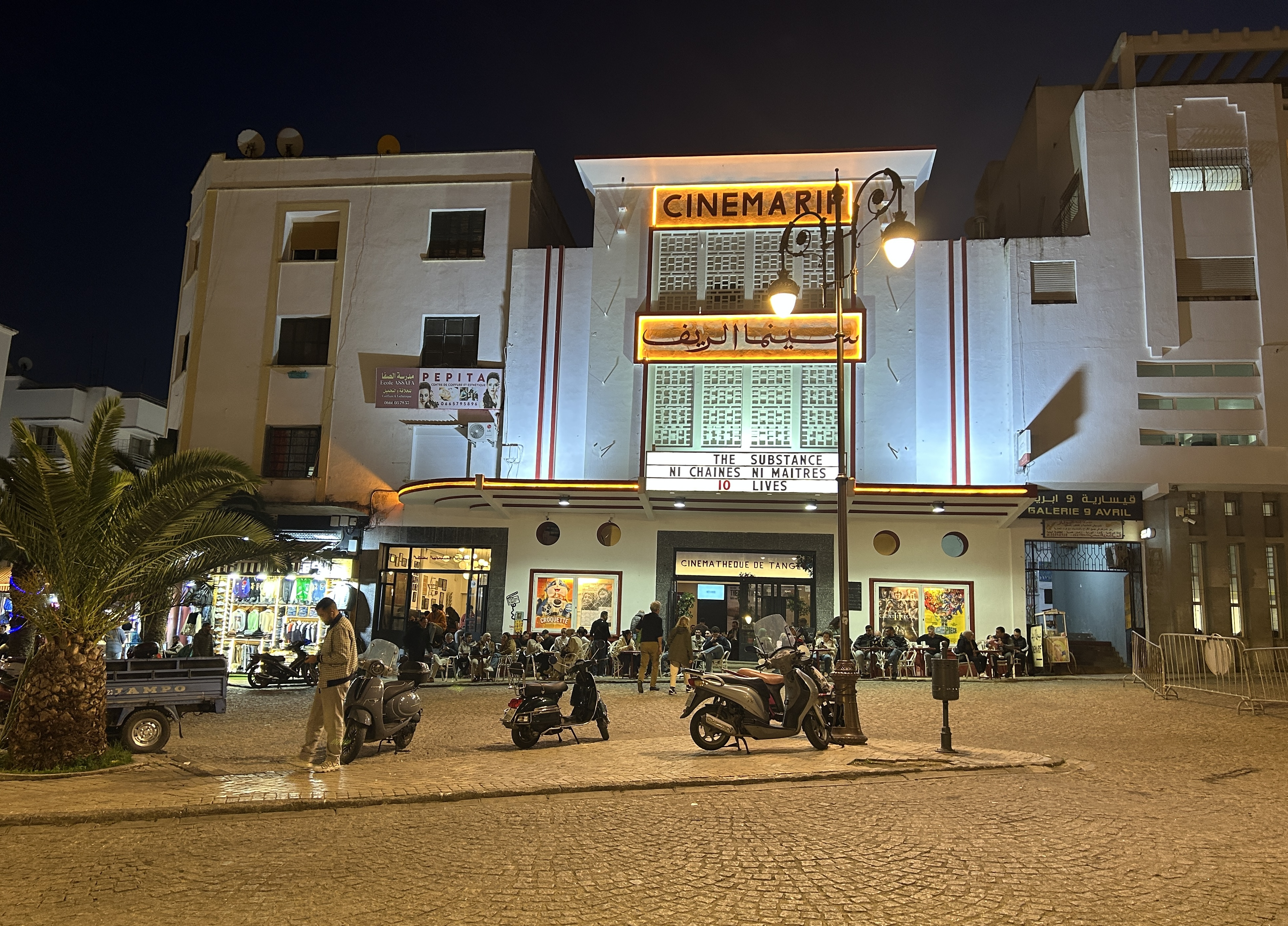
Cinema Rif movie theater

In the 1940s and until 1956 when the city was an International Zone, the city served as a playground for eccentric millionaires, a meeting place for secret agents and a variety of crooks and a mecca for speculators and gamblers, an Eldorado for the fun-loving "Haute Volée". During the Second World War the Office of Strategic Services operated out of Tangier for various operations in North Africa.

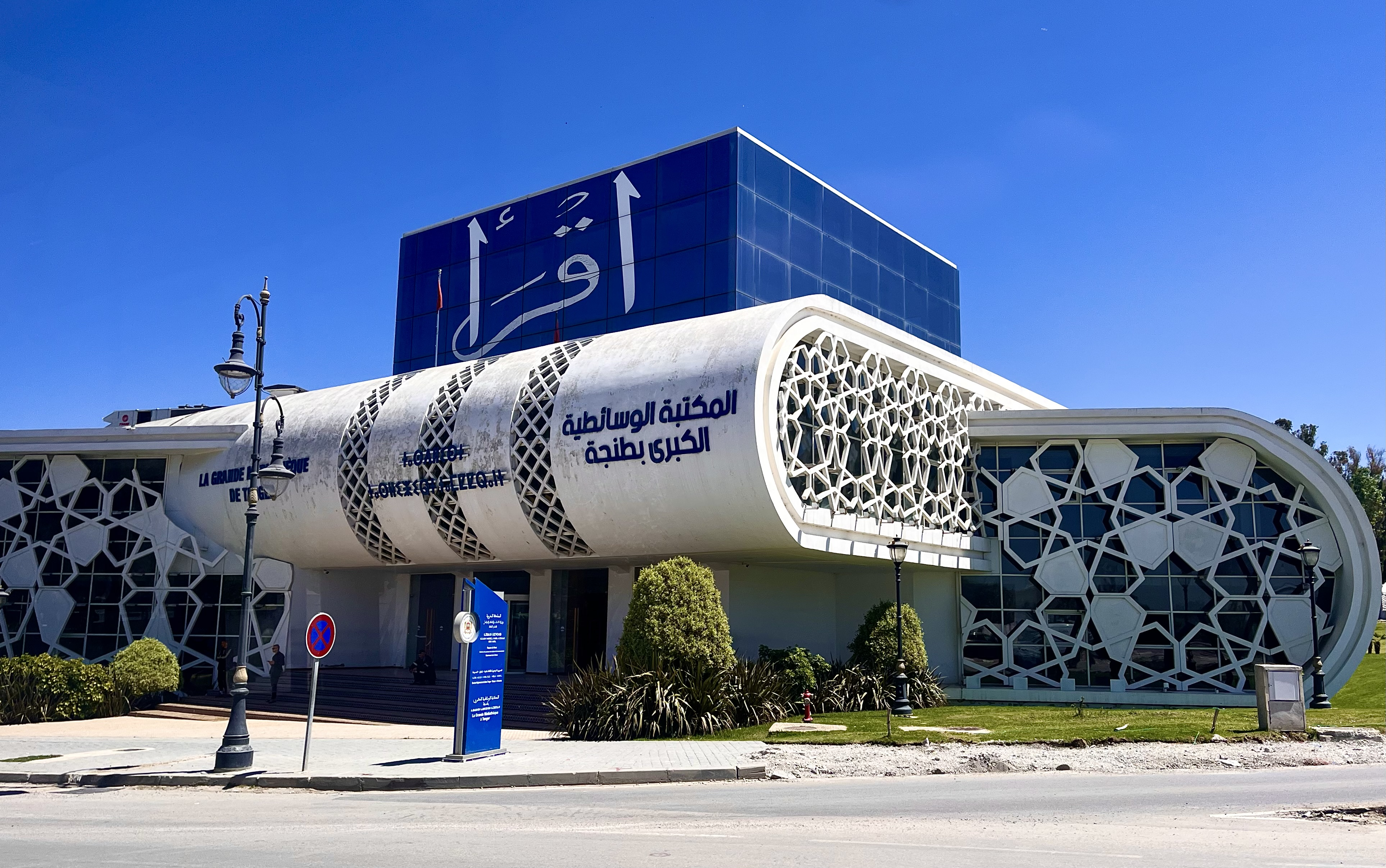
The 'Grande Médiathèque de Tanger' library

Around the same time, a circle of writers emerged which was to have a profound and lasting literary influence. This included Paul Bowles, who lived and wrote for over half a century in the city, Tennessee Williams and Jean Genet as well as Mohamed Choukri (one of North Africa's most controversial and widely read authors), Abdeslam Boulaich, Larbi Layachi, Mohammed Mrabet and Ahmed Yacoubi. Among the best known works from this period is Choukri's For Bread Alone. Originally written in Classical Arabic, the English edition was the result of close collaboration with Bowles (who worked with Choukri to provide the translation and supplied the introduction). Tennessee Williams described it as "a true document of human desperation, shattering in its impact." Independently, William S. Burroughs lived in Tangier for four years and wrote Naked Lunch, whose locale of Interzone is an allusion to the city.

After several years of gradual disentanglement from Spanish and French colonial control, Morocco reintegrated the city of Tangier at the signing of the Tangier Protocol on 29 October 1956. Tangier remains a very popular tourist destination for cruise ships and day visitors from Spain and Gibraltar.

=== Religion ===
The Catholic Cathedral of Tangier

Due to its Christian past before the Muslim conquest, Tangier remains a titular see of the Roman Catholic Church. Originally, the city was part of the larger Roman province of Mauretania Caesariensis, which included much of North Africa. Later the area was subdivided, with the eastern part keeping the former name and the newer part receiving the name of Mauretania Tingitana. It is not known exactly at what period there may have been an episcopal see at Tangier in ancient times, but in the Middle Ages Tangier was used as a titular see (i.e., an honorific fiction for the appointment of curial and auxiliary bishops), placing it in Mauretania Tingitana. For the historical reasons given above, one official list of the Roman Curia places the see in Mauretania Caesarea.

Towards the end of the 3rd century, Tangier was the scene of the martyrdoms of St. Marcellus, mentioned in the Roman Martyrology on 30 October, and of St. Cassian, mentioned on 3 December.

Under the Portuguese, the diocese of Tangier was a suffragan of Lisbon but, in 1570, it was united with the diocese of Ceuta. Six Bishops of Tangier from this period are known, the first—who did not reside in his see—in 1468. During the era of the French and Spanish protectorates over Morocco, Tangier was the residence of the Prefect Apostolic of Morocco, the mission having been founded on 28 November 1630 and entrusted to the Friars Minor. At the time, it had a Catholic church, several chapels, schools and a hospital. The Prefecture Apostolic was raised to the status of Vicariate Apostolic of Morocco on 14 April 1908. On 14 November 1956, it became the Archdiocese of Tangier.

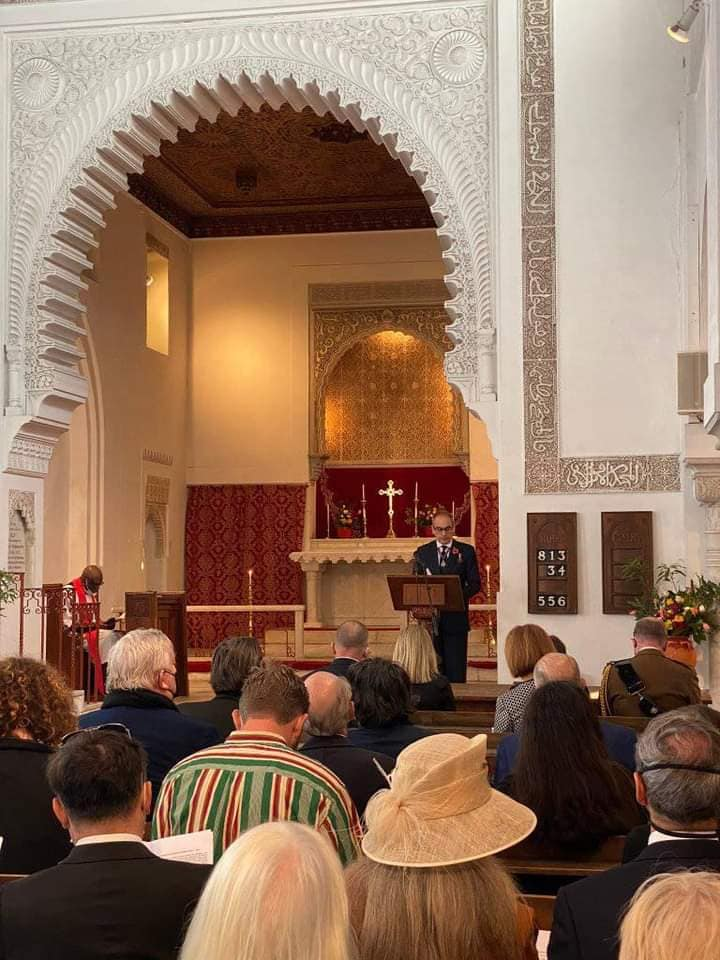
Moroccan Christians from Tangier.

The city also has the Anglican church of Saint Andrew. Since independence in 1956, the European population has decreased substantially. In the years leading up to the First World War, European Christians formed almost a quarter the population of Tangier. The city also is still home to a small community of Moroccan Christians, as well as a small group of foreign Roman Catholic and Protestant residents.

Jews have a long history in Tangier. In the years leading up to the First World War, Jews formed almost a quarter the population of Tangier. According to the World Jewish Congress there were only 150 Moroccan Jews remaining in Tangier.

=== Sport ===
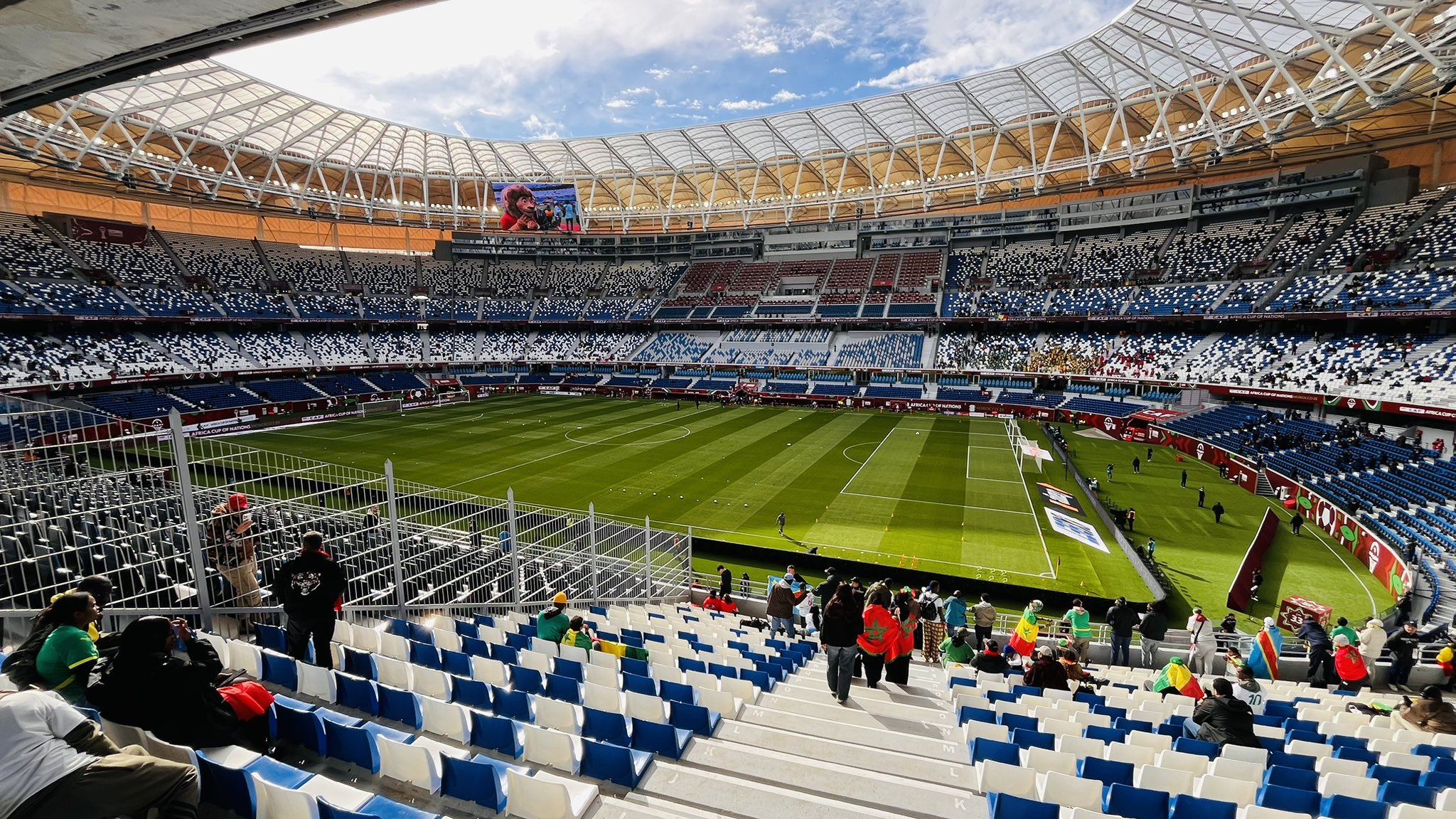
Tangier Grand Stadium

Tangierians regard football as the primary entertainment when it comes to sport-material. There are several football fields around the city. Tangier would have been one of the host cities for the 2015 Africa Cup of Nations football tournament, which would be played at the new Ibn Batouta Stadium and in other cities across Morocco, until Morocco was banned from participating the Africa Cup of Nations due to their denial. Instead Tangier hosted matches for the 2025 edition after Guinea withdraw from hosting. It is scheduled to also host matches for the 2030 FIFA World Cup.

Basketball comes the second most practised sport in Tangier. The city is known for their local teams IRT, Ajax Tanger, Juventus Tangier and so on.

National Cricket Stadium is the only top-class cricket stadium in Morocco. Stadium hosted its first International Tournament from 12 to 21 August 2002. Pakistan, South Africa and Sri Lanka competed in a 50-overs one day triangular series. The International Cricket Council has granted international status to the Tangier Cricket Stadium, official approval that will allow it to become North Africa's first international cricket venue.

=== Museums ===
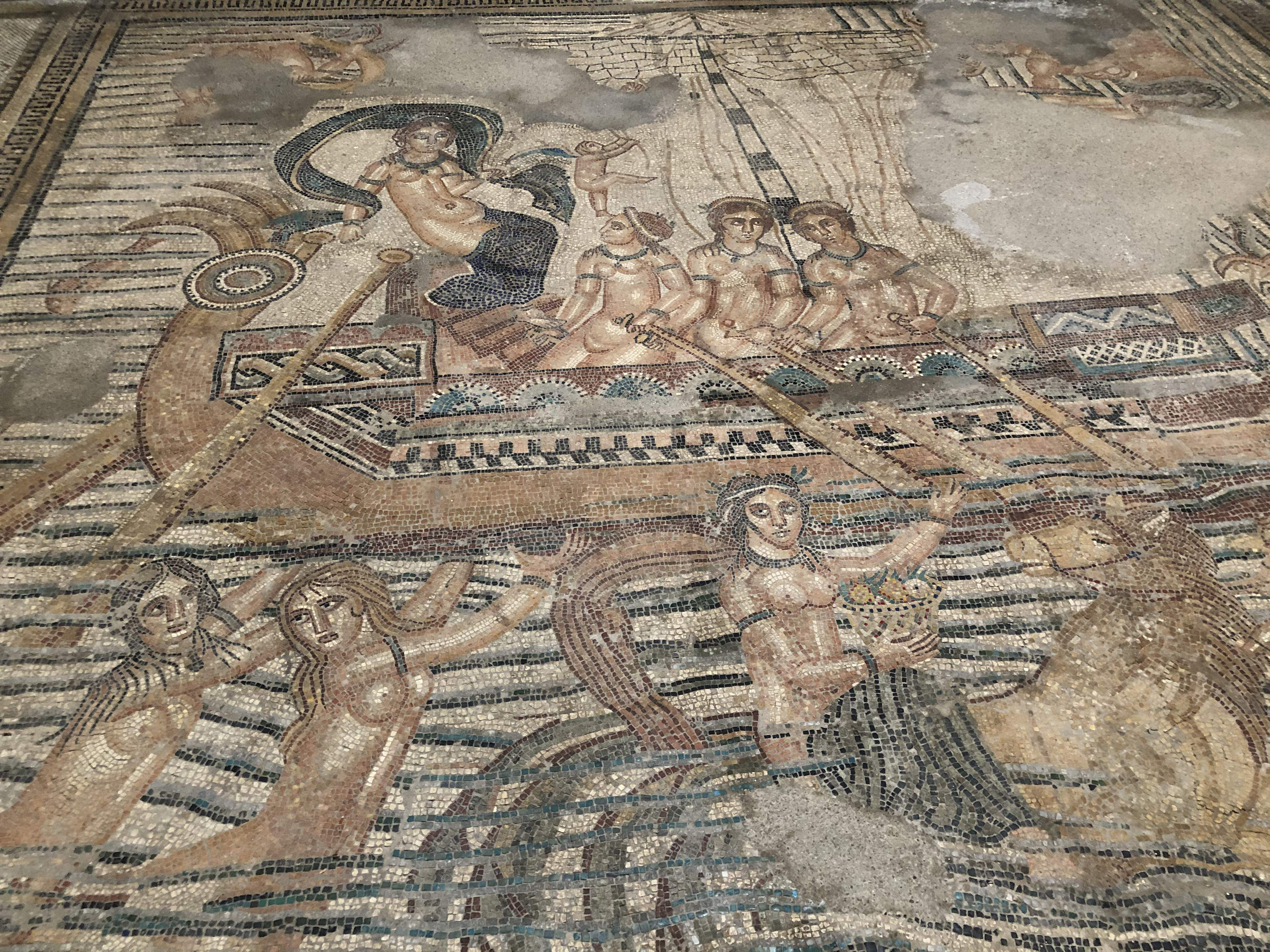
Mosaic from Kasbah Museum of Mediterranean Cultures

The Museum of the American Legation, whose building was granted to the United States in 1821 by the Sultan Moulay Suliman served as a consulate of the United States and a later legation, as well as a high traffic post for the intelligence agents of the Second World War and a Peace Corps training facility. Today, its courtyards and narrow corridors serve as an elaborate museum that demonstrates relations between the United States and Morocco and the Moroccan heritage, including a wing dedicated to Paul Bowles, where you can see the documents and photographs of the writer donated to the museum by the gallerist and friend of the writer Gloria Kirby in 2010.

Fondation Lorin (Musée de la Fondation Lorin) opened in 1930 in a former synagogue. In addition to art, there are newspapers, photographs and posters on display.

=== In popular culture ===
==== Espionage ====
Tangier has been reputed as a safe house for international spying activities. Its position during the Cold War and during other spying periods of the 19th and 20th centuries is legendary.

Tangier acquired the reputation of a spying and smuggling centre and attracted foreign capital due to political neutrality and commercial liberty at that time. It was via a British bank in Tangier that the Bank of England in 1943 for the first time obtained samples of the high-quality forged British currency produced by the Nazis in "Operation Bernhard".

The city has also been a subject for many spy fiction books and films.

== Notable people ==
- Ibn Battuta (1304–1378), Moroccan scholar and traveler who went on a worldwide quest.
- Roger Elliott (c. 1665–1714), first British Governor of Gibraltar
- Alexander Spotswood (1676–1740), American Lieutenant-Colonel and Lieutenant Governor of Virginia.
- Haim Benchimol (1826 or 1834 - 1906) businessman, newspaper publisher, Jewish community leader and philanthropist
- Ion Hanford Perdicaris (1840–1925), Greek-American author, lawyer and painter; he became the unofficial head of Tangier's foreign community
- Alexandre Rey Colaço (1854–1928), Portuguese pianist
- Walter Burton Harris (1866–1933), journalist, writer, traveller and socialite
- Heinz Tietjen (1881–1967), German music composer
- Hélène Cazès-Benatar (1898–1979), Jewish lawyer and human rights activist. Morocco's first woman lawyer
- Leon Benzaquen (1902–1977), doctor who became the personal doctor for King Mohammed V of Morocco, and the first Moroccan Jewish minister after Morocco gained independence in 1956
- Abdullah al-Ghumari (1910–1993), Muslim cleric, scholar of hadith, jurist and theologian
- Paul Bowles (1910–1999), American writer, composer and ethnomusicologist
- William S. Burroughs (1914–1997), Beat Generation writer, wrote Naked Lunch during the 1950s in Tangier.
- Abderrahmane Youssoufi (1924–2020), former Prime Minister of Morocco
- Ahmed Yacoubi (1928–1985), international painter and storyteller
- Samuel Toledano (1929–1996), Spanish-Jewish prominent leader of the Jewish community in Spain
- Claude-Jean Philippe (1933–2016), French film critic
- Emmanuel Hocquard (1940–2019), French poet
- Ignacio Ramonet (1943), Spanish academic, journalist, and writer. He was not born in Tangier, but he did spend his childhood and youth in the city
- Shlomo Ben-Ami (born 1943), Israeli diplomat, politician, and historian
- Jean-Luc Mélenchon (born 1951), French politician, currently MEP
- Ralph Benmergui (born 1955), Canadian TV and radio host at the Canadian Broadcasting Corporation
- Helena Maleno (born 1970), human rights defender, journalist and writer
- Karim Debbagh (born 1972), Moroccan film producer
- Yasser Harrak (born c. 1975), writer and human rights activist.
- Sanaa Hamri (born 1977), Moroccan music video director.
- Ali Boussaboun (born 1979), former international footballer with 12 caps for Morocco
- Zakaria Ramhani (born 1983), visual artist
- Muslim (born 1981), Moroccan rapper and songwriter
- Mohamed Métalsi (born 1954), urbanist and former director at the Institut du Monde Arabe
- Giselda Volodi (1959), family of writer Carlo Mazzantini and artist Anne Donnelly. She is the sister of writer/actress Margaret Mazzantini and producer Moira Mazzantini.

== Twin towns – sister cities ==
Tangier is twinned with:

- Algeciras, Spain
- Bizerte, Tunisia
- Cádiz, Spain
- Da Nang, Vietnam
- Faro, Portugal
- Liège, Belgium
- Metz, France
- Puteaux, France
- Saint-Denis, Réunion, France
- Saint-Josse-ten-Noode, Belgium
- Santiago, Chile
- Rio de Janeiro, Brazil

== Gallery ==
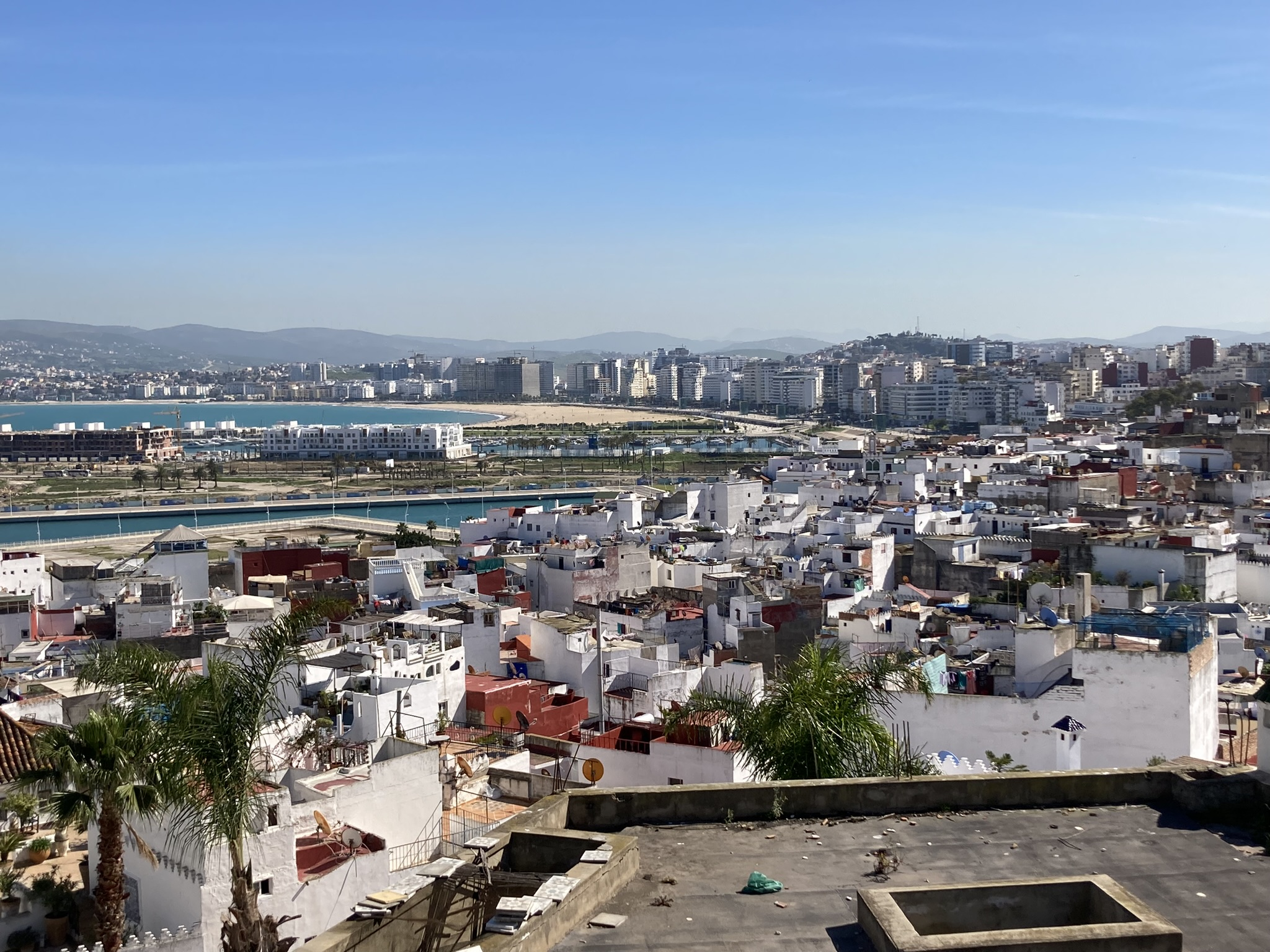
Panoramic view of Tangier

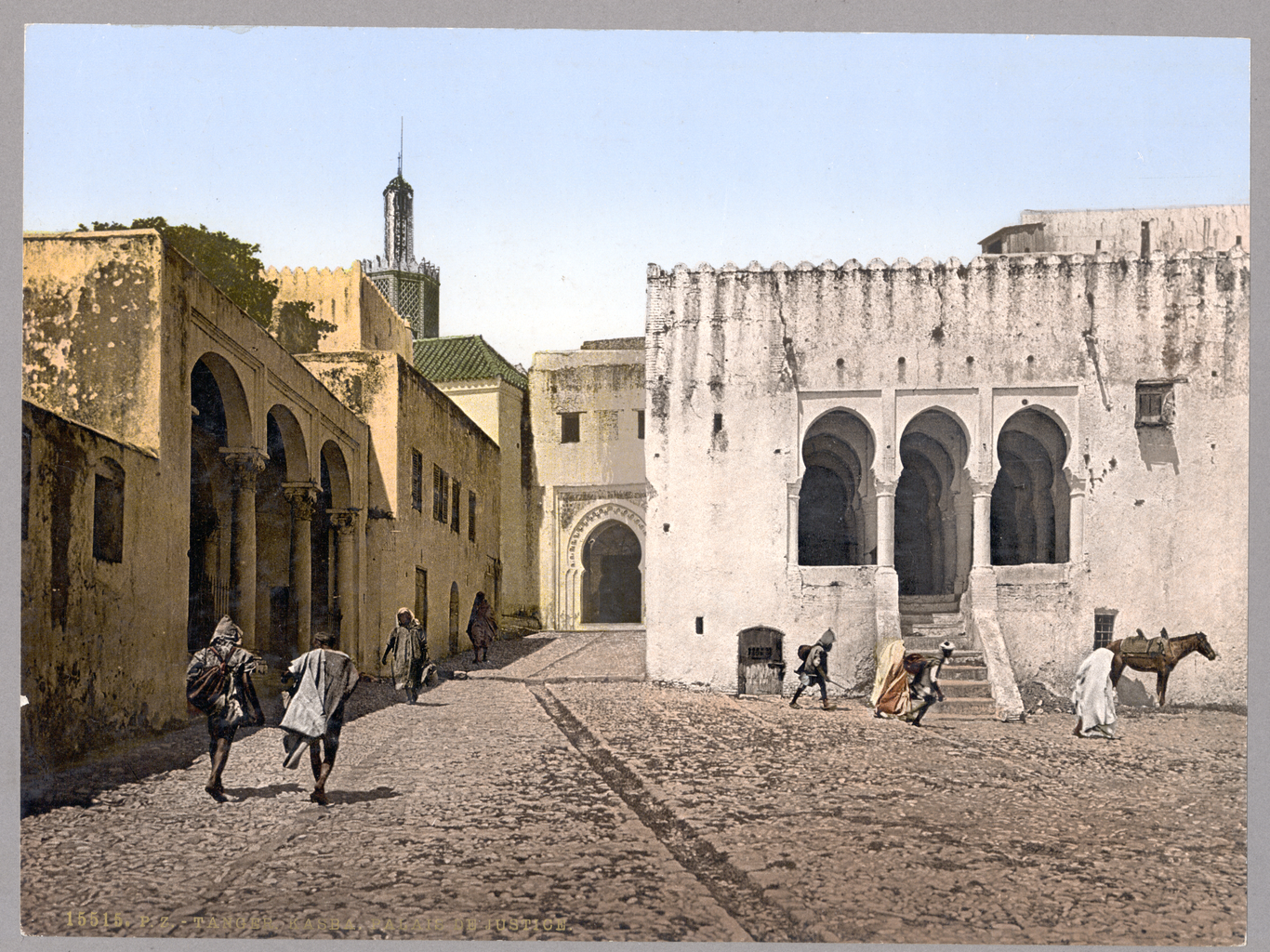
Old tribunal, Kasbah Mosque, Kasbah Palace entrance and Bayt al-mal (treasury), c. 1900

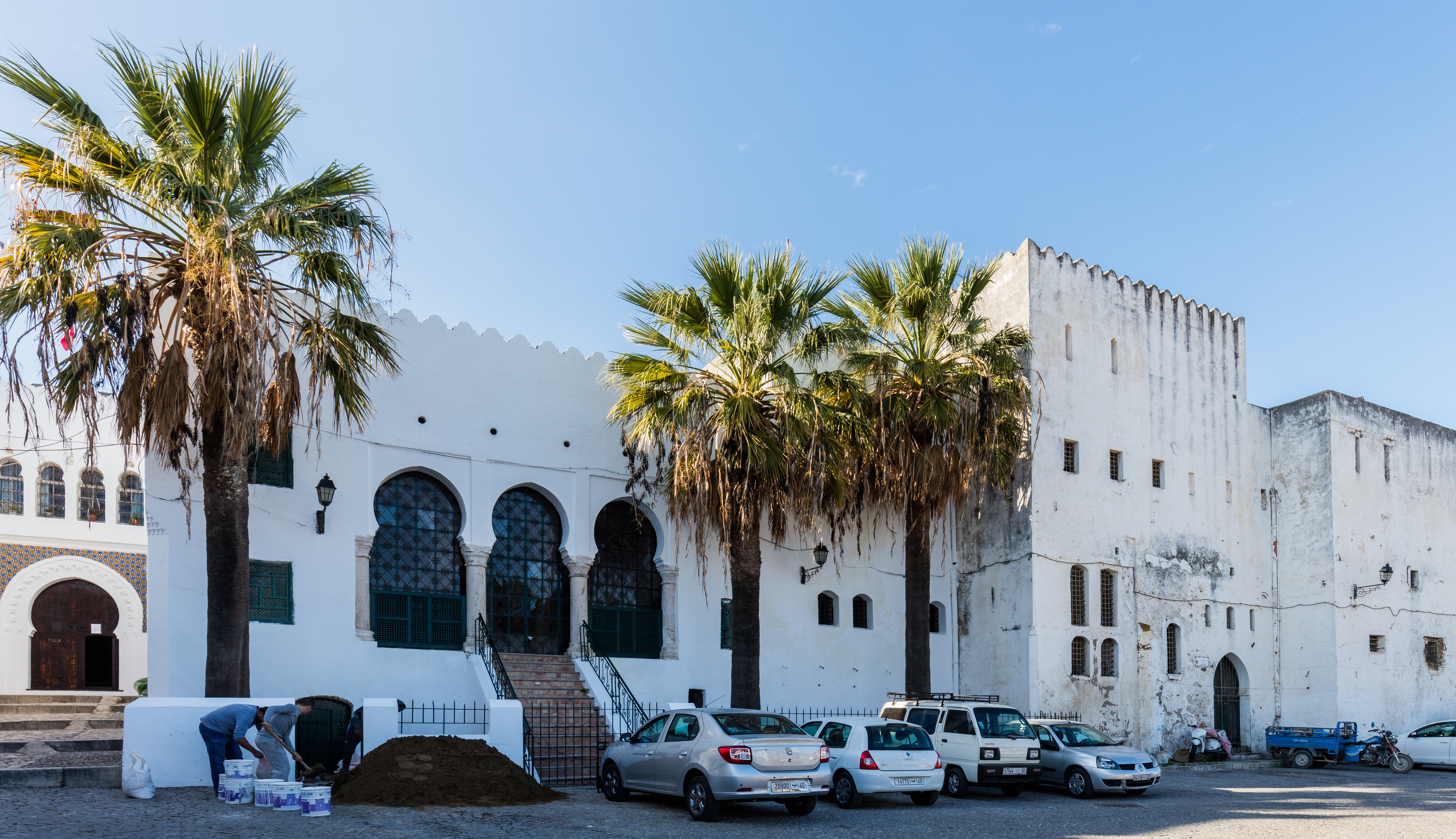
Former palace entrance, treasury and prison, 2015

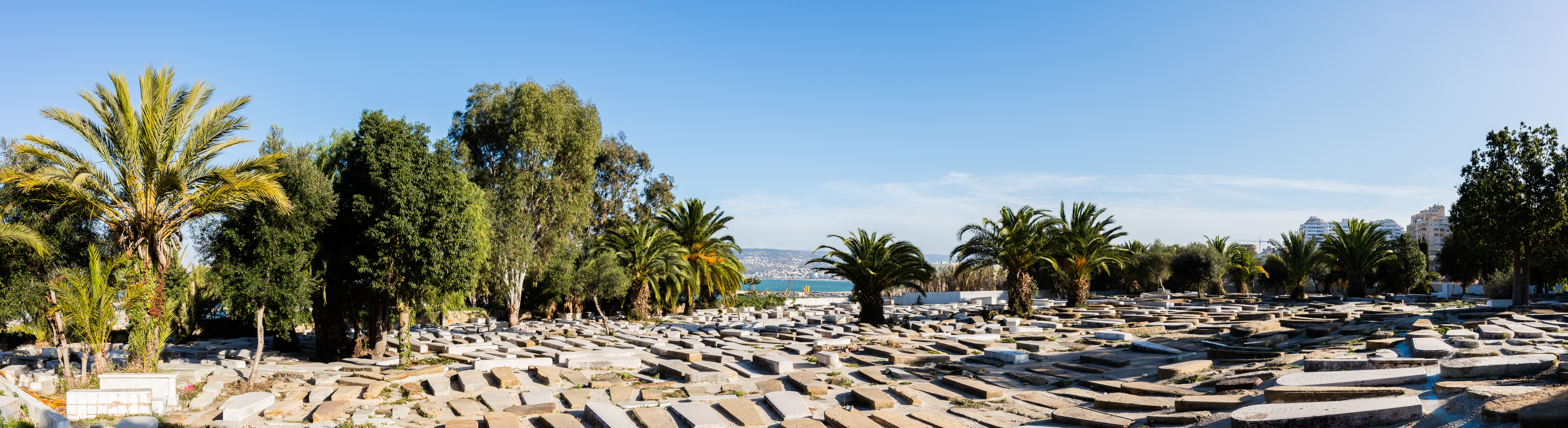
Jewish Cemetery

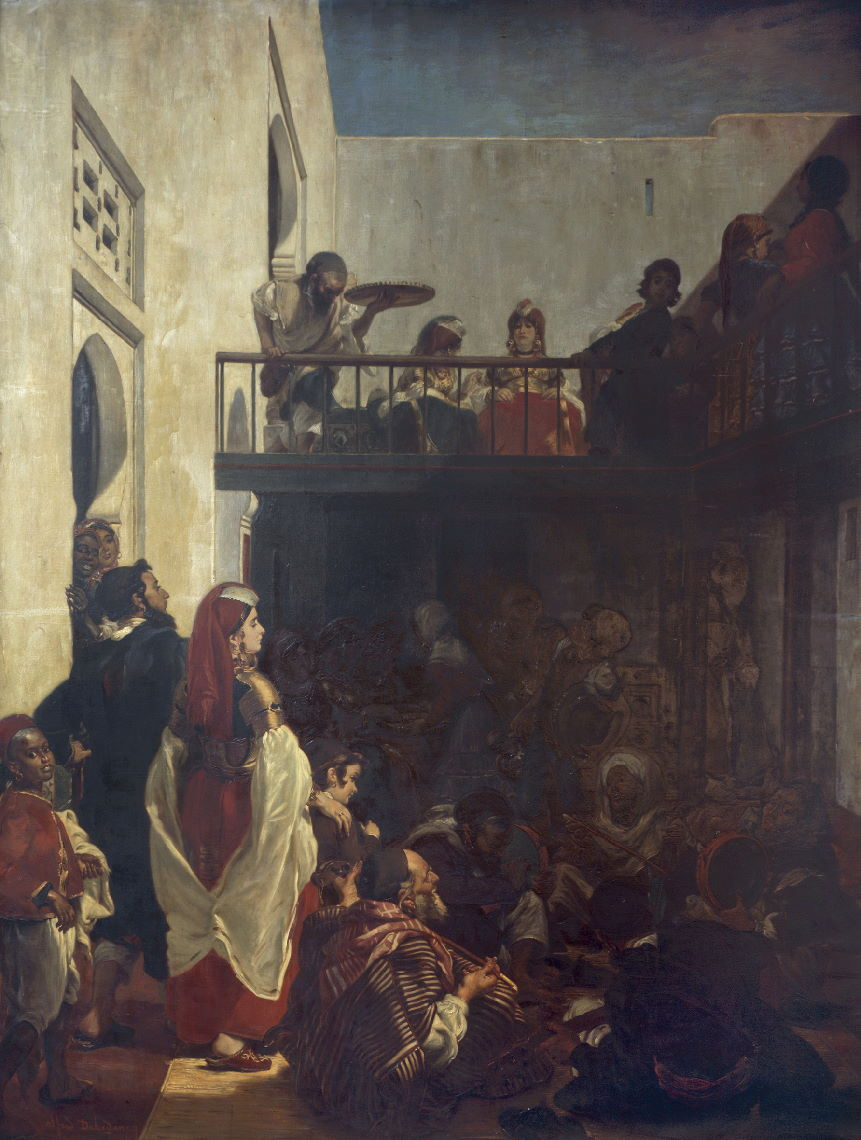
Jewish wedding in Tangier, Alfred Dehodencq

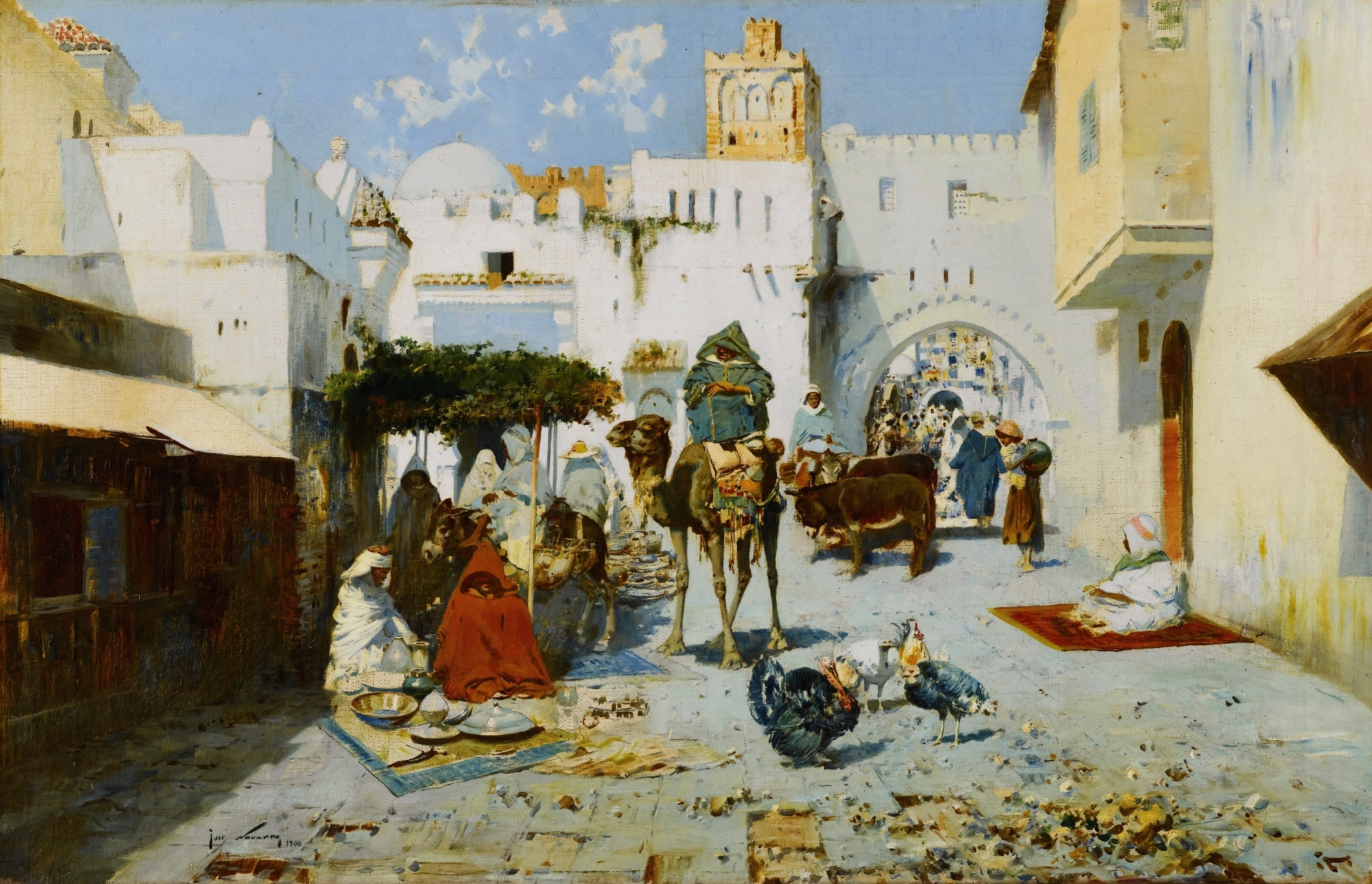
Souk

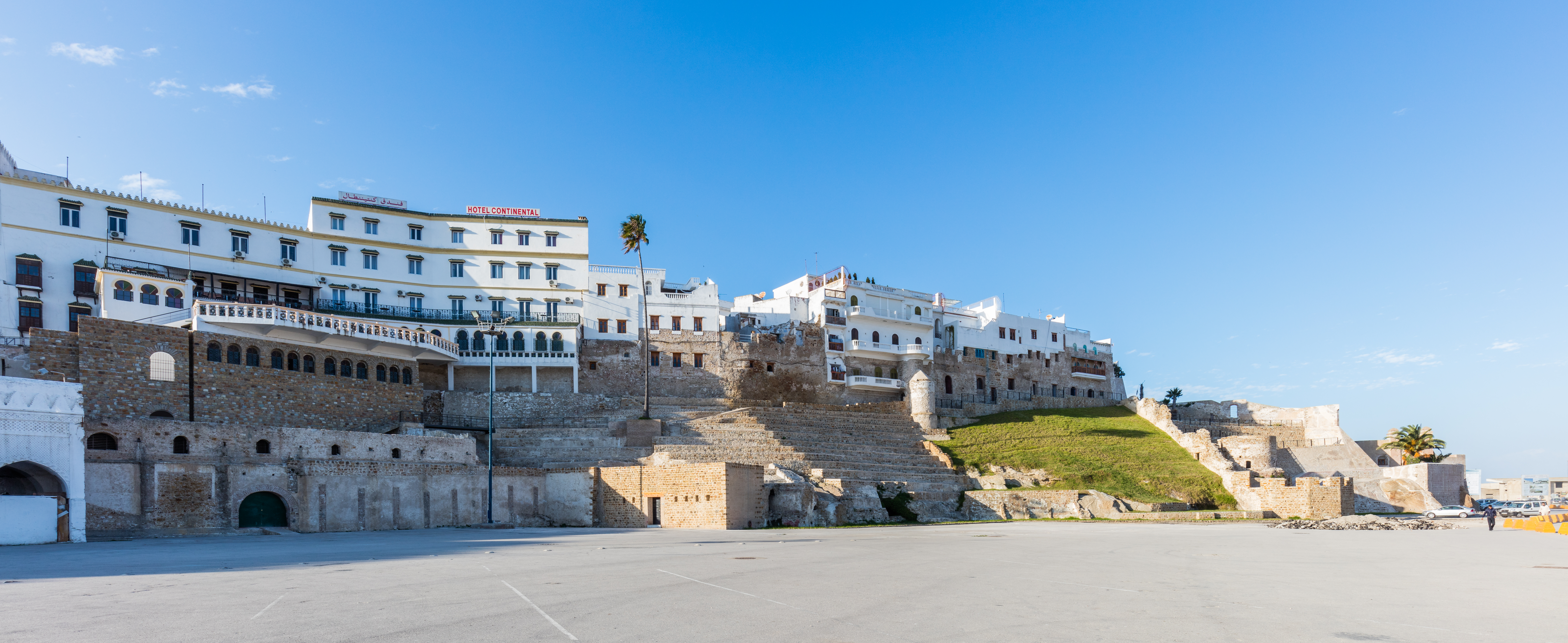
City walls

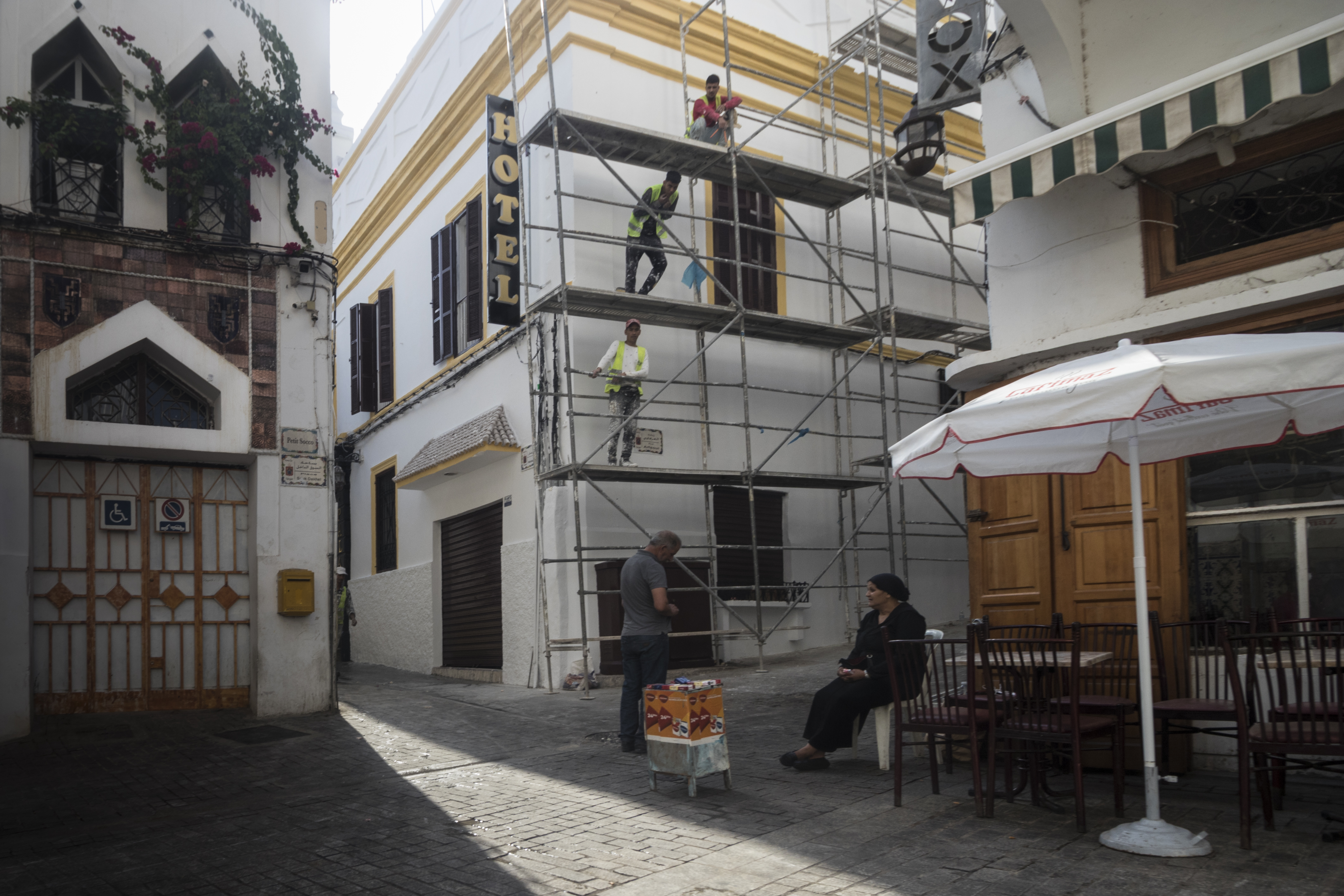
Renovation Work

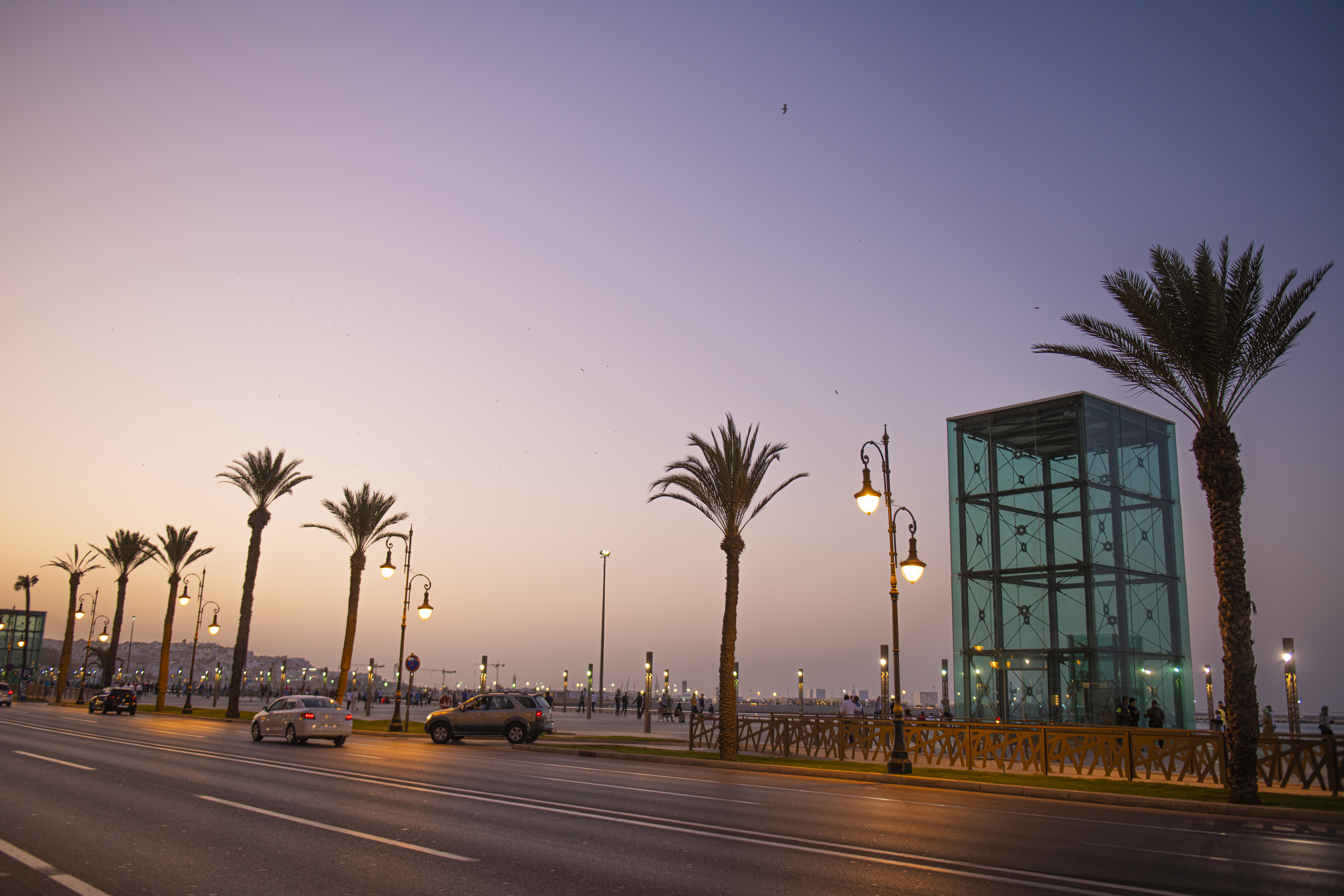
Tangier corniche

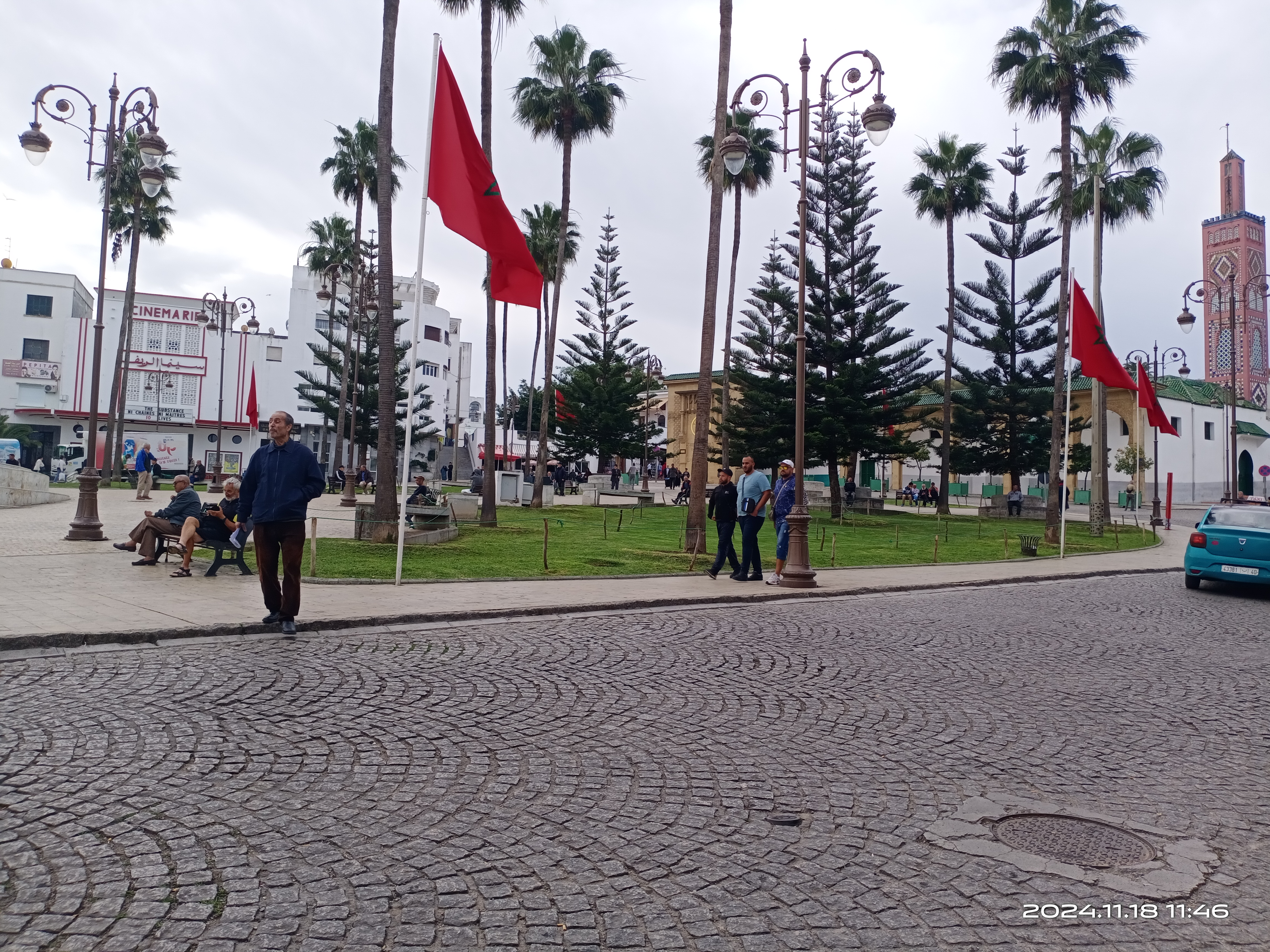
Grand Socco

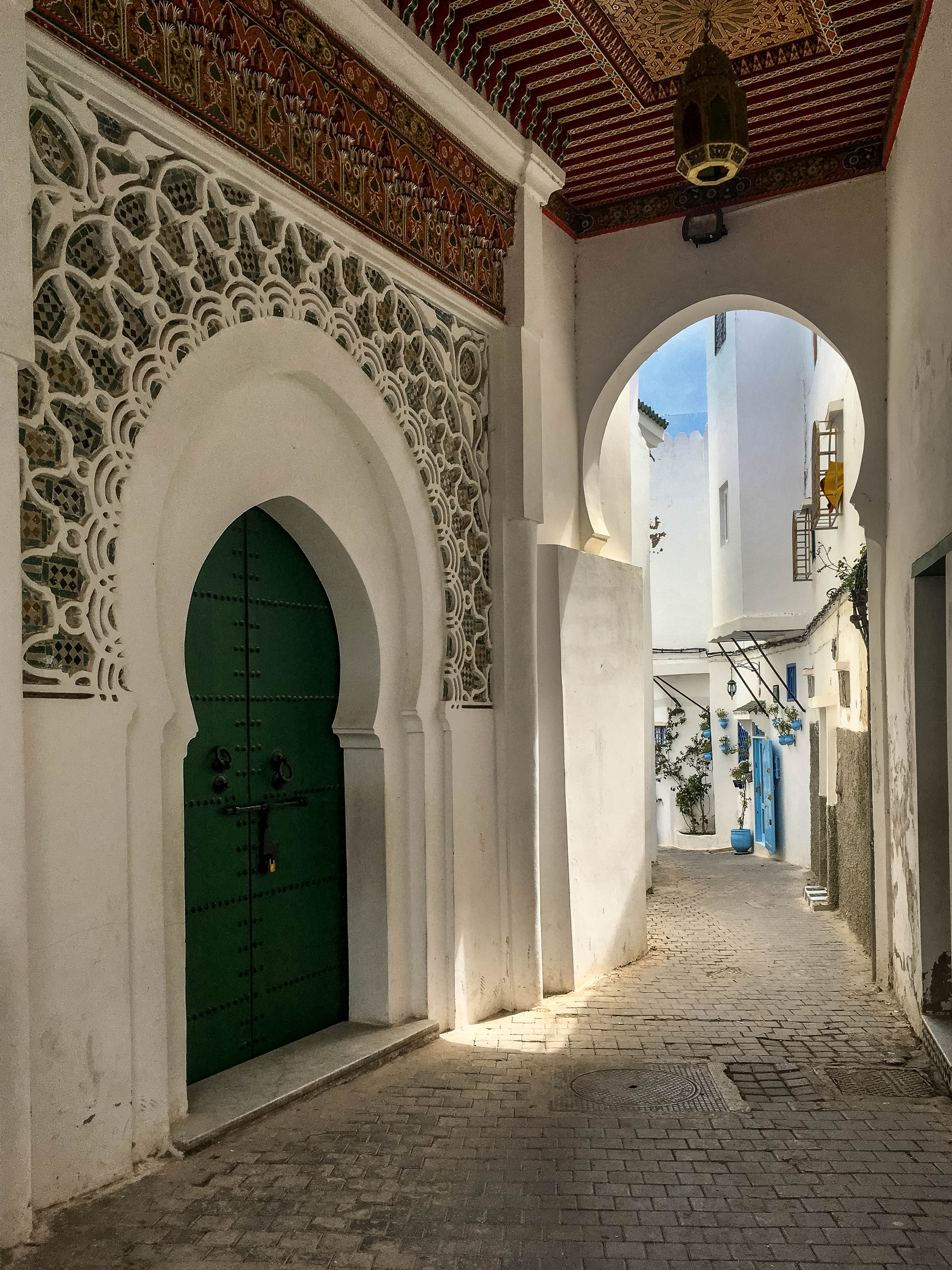
Kasbah Mosque, Tangier

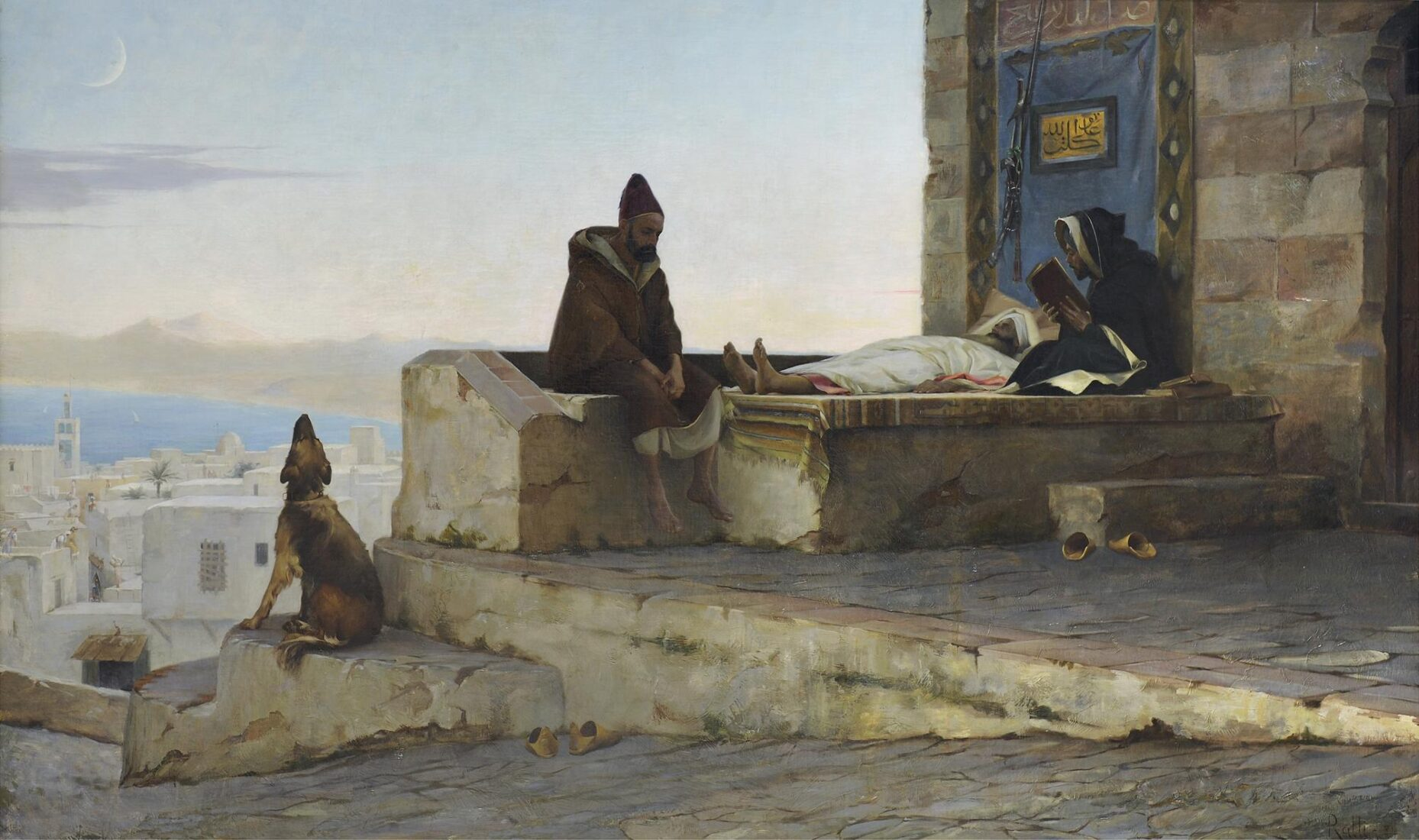
Vigil of the Dead Pasha of Tangiers, Théodore Ralli

== See also ==
- History of Morocco
- List of cities in Morocco
- Tingis & Mauretania Tingitana
- List of Colonial Heads of Tangier
- English Tangier
- Tangier International Zone
