= Abdelhafid Palace =

Historic structure in Tangier, Morocco

Coordinates: 35°47′08″N 5°49′18″W

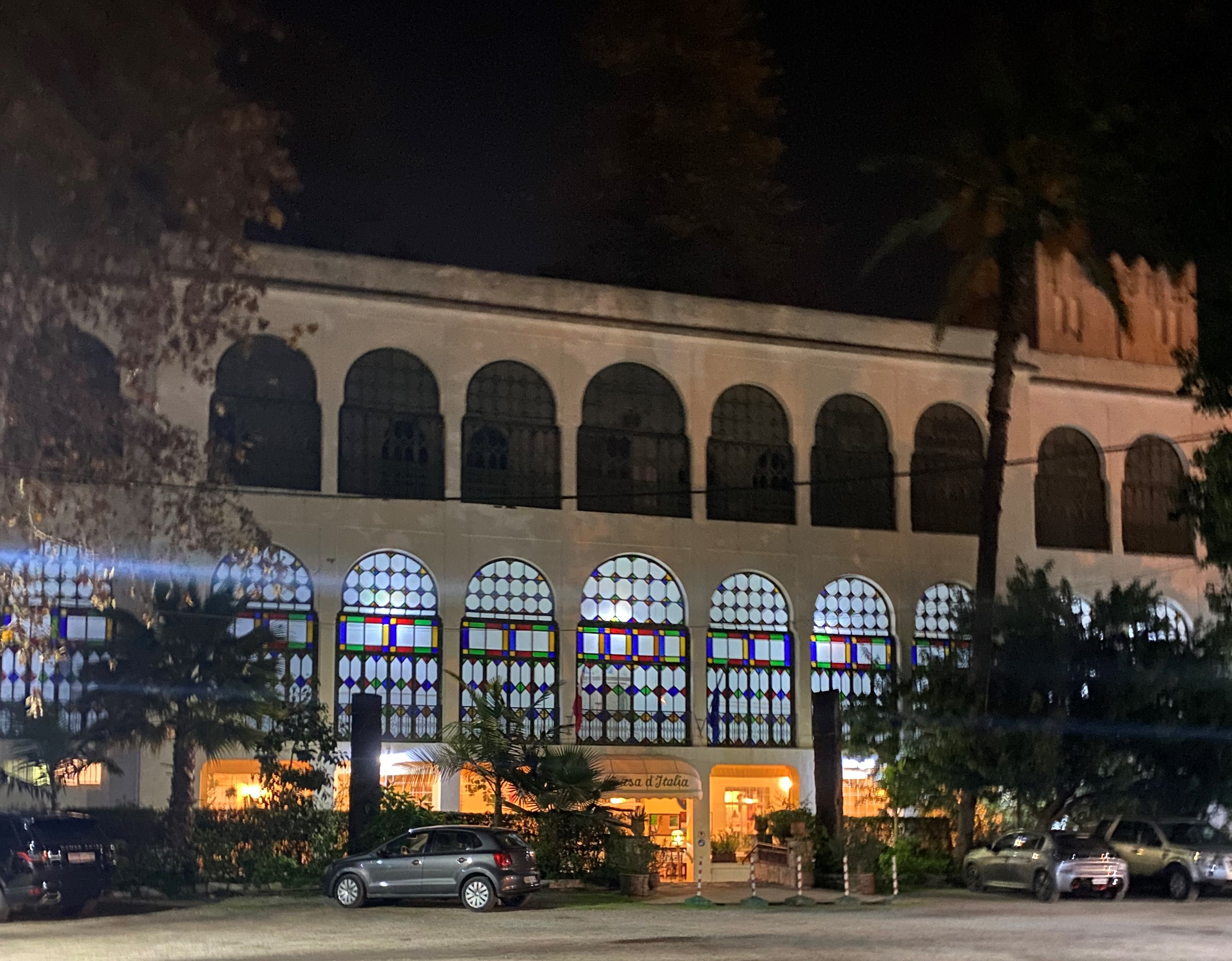
South façade at night

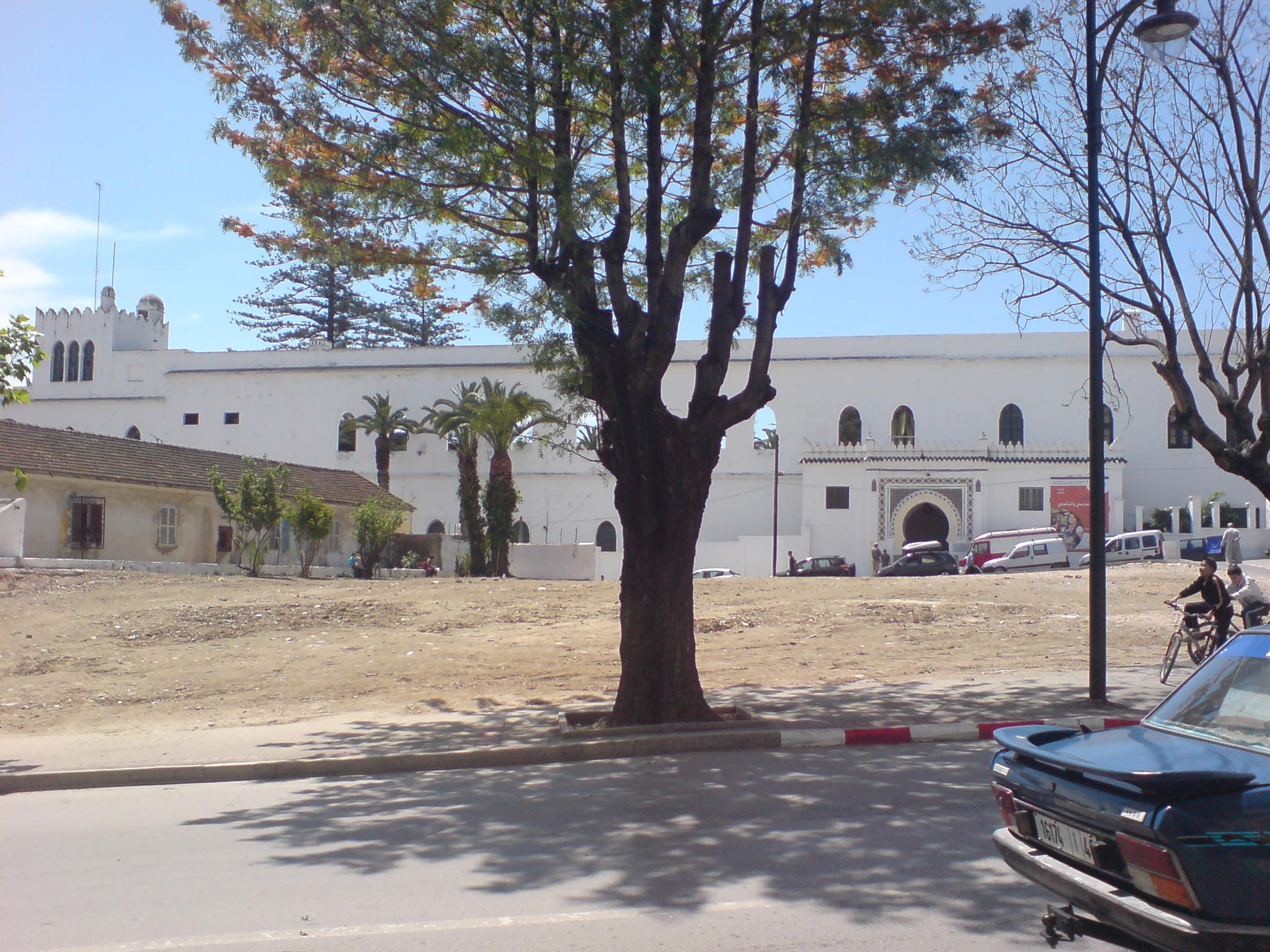
Side view of the palace with main entrance

The Abdelhafid Palace or Moulay Hafid Palace is a historic structure at 23, rue Mohammed Ben Abedelouhab in the Hasnouna neighborhood of Tangier, Morocco. It was built in 1912–1913 as the intended main residence of former Sultan Abdelhafid following his abdication, but was never used for that purpose. In 1927, it was purchased by Italy and subsequently renamed Palazzo Littorio, hosting various public institutions including schools and a hospital. In 1943 the Badoglio government had it renamed Casa d'Italia, and a few years later it became known as the Palace of the Italian Institutions. Despite it hosting various Italian-related activities and was renovated in the early 2000s, it has long been underutilized.

== Background ==
The property on which the palace now stands was previously the location of the Belgian legation in Tangier, established there in the late 19th century by Belgium's first consul Ernest Daulin, surrounded by a vast garden. It was then purchased by Abraham Sicsu, a member of the local Jewish community that had worked as a translator for Daulin and later became Belgian consul himself.

== Palace of Abdelhafid ==
A few months after Abdelhafid signed the Treaty of Fes that established the French protectorate in Morocco, resident-general Hubert Lyautey negotiated his abdication in August 1912 in exchange for a massive pension. Abdelhafid used part of it for the palace in Tangier, which he intended as his main retirement residence. He acquired the Belgian legation property from Abraham Sicsu, and had the legation building demolished. The new palace was designed by Diego Jimenez Armstrong, a Paris-trained architect who designed Tangier's iconic Gran Teatro Cervantes around the same time, and built in 1913 in reinforced concrete, with ornate fittings in precious stone and woodwork.

The former sultan never inhabited it, however. He departed from Morocco immediately after his abdication, stayed for a while in France and then took residence in Spain instead of returning to Tangier as previously intended. His pro-German associations during World War I led Lyautey to order the confiscation of his Moroccan properties in 1918. The protectorate authorities then sold the Tangier palace in a government auction, which was won by the Paquet shipping company of Marseille founded by Nicolas Paquet, a predecessor entity of the Chargeurs group. Paquet subsequently kept it unused for nearly a decade. As a consequence, the palace was continuously empty from its completion to its Italian purchase in 1927.

== Italian institutions ==
Fascist Italy had misgivings about not having been involved in the Tangier Protocol that had been signed in December 1923 by France, Spain, and the United Kingdom and established the Tangier International Zone. The Italian community in Tangier had been small and undistinguished, its main organization being a small public school, established in 1919 from a private initiative started in 1914 by Italian educator Elisa Chimenti. As Italy moved towards joining the Zone in 1926, it endeavored to enhance its profile in Tangier, as part of a broader vision of Italian influence in the whole of North Africa. In January 1927, the National Association for Succour of Italian Missionaries (Italian: Associazione Nazionale per Soccorrere i Missionari Italiani, ANSMI), acting as a front for the Italian Government, purchased the Abdelhafid Palace from the Paquet company. In line with Fascist practice on the Italian mainland, the property was dubbed Palazzo Littorio. It soon hosted several educational institutions as well as a small hospital, complemented in the 1930s by a radiotelegraphic station and a small post office.

A Catholic church dedicated to Saint Francis was erected on the western side of the property for Franciscan monks in 1939–1940, replacing a smaller chapel built in 1927. Its construction stimulated other national communities to build churches of their own, namely the French Church of Tangier (dedicated in 1953) and the Spanish Church that became the city's cathedral (dedicated in 1961).

While the complex's boarding schools for boys and girls were closed following World War II, the other schools remained in activity until closing in 1987. The hospital also survived postwar turmoil and has more recently been managed by Franciscan nuns, still under the aegis of ANSMI. The other recent occupants of the palace have included the Dante Alighieri Society and the Casa d'Italia restaurant. A foundation was formed in 2010 to manage the parts of the palace other than the hospital, and took the name of Elisa Chimenti who had founded the first Italian school in 1914. In recent years the palace has hosted cultural events such as the Tangier International Book Fair, the Mediterranean Nights Festival, and the Tanjazz music festival.

== See also ==
- Kasbah Palace, Tangier
- Marshan Palace, Tangier
- List of Moroccan royal residences
