= Roman Catholic Cathedral of Tangier =

Tangier Cathedral Catedral Espíritu Santo e Inmaculada Concepción Cathédrale de l’Immaculée-Conception et du Saint-Esprit
- Holy Spirit Cathedral

Religion
- Affiliation: Roman Catholic Church
- Ecclesiastical or organisational status: Cathedral
- Status: Active

Location
- Location: Tangier, Morocco
- Interactive map of Tangier Cathedral; Catedral Espíritu Santo e Inmaculada Concepción; Cathédrale de l’Immaculée-Conception et du Saint-Esprit
- Coordinates: 35°46′N 5°48′W

Architecture
- Architect: Luis Martínez-Feduchi
- Style: Modernist
- Groundbreaking: 1953
- Completed: 1961

The Roman Catholic Cathedral of Tangier, whose full name is the Cathedral of the Immaculate Conception and the Holy Spirit, also known as the Spanish Cathedral, is the seat of the Roman Catholic Archdiocese of Tangier, Morocco.

== Background ==
The Franciscans had a longstanding presence in Morocco, in line with their early tradition of engagement with the Muslim world going back to the famed encounter between Francis of Assisi and Sultan Al-Kamil at Damietta in 1219. For a long time, the only Catholic place of worship in all of Morocco was a Franciscan chapel on the side of the Spanish consulate building near the Petit Socco of Tangier. From the 1860s onward, Father José María Lerchundi developed the Franciscan presence in Tangier, including the building of the Church of the Immaculate Conception in the medina in 1880–1881.

In 1882, Lerchundi purchased property outside of the medina, in what was still countryside at the time, with the project of establishing a large Franciscan convent. Lerchundi started the development with the construction of a hospital, which was inaugurated in 1888 (and more than a century later, was repurposed by the Spanish government as a cultural center named after Lerchundi). In 1891 or 1892, Antoni Gaudí visited Tangier and was encouraged by Lerchundi to prepare a highly original design for the convent, inspired by Saharan vernacular architecture. Gaudí's plans were approved by the Franciscan congregation on 17 October 1893, but remained unrealized even though Gaudí reused some features for the Sagrada Família.

The convent of the Holy Spirit was eventually built in 1902–1904 on a neo-Renaissance design by Franciscan architect Fray Francisco Serra. The construction of its conventual church's apse started in 1904, but was soon left mostly unrealized. In 1938, the Vicar Apostolic of Morocco (i.e. head of the Catholic Church in Spanish Morocco, based in Tangier), Franciscan Father José María Betanzos y Hormaechevarría, started efforts to revive the church building project next to the convent and make it a new cathedral for the entire Catholic community in Tangier, which was mostly Spanish. No financing was forthcoming from the Spanish government, however, during the Spanish Civil War and its immediate aftermath.

== Cathedral ==
Circumstances changed by the late 1940s. Italy had built a large church a few years earlier on its grounds next to the former Abdelhafid Palace, and the French community was about to start construction of its own church in Tangier's modern city expansion. Francoist Spain aimed at regaining influence in the Tangier International Zone after the end of its military occupation in October 1945, an ambition also illustrated by the completion in 1948 of a prominent new building for the Spanish Consulate in the city. In 1948, Francisco Franco approved the project to build a Spanish cathedral in Tangier and entrusted it to his foreign minister Alberto Martín-Artajo.

A new project was subsequently designed by Luis Martínez-Feduchi, the foreign ministry's architect who had designed the new consulate building. After several iterations, Feduchi settled on a streamlined modern design, with a luminous, angular nave and a soaring bell tower inspired by St Mark's Campanile in Venice. Construction started slowly from late 1950, and a cornerstone laying ceremony was held on 4 June 1953; the cathedral was eventually dedicated on 8 December 1961 to the Immaculate Conception and the Holy Spirit, echoing the respective names of Lerchundi's 1880s church in the medina and of the nearby convent.

The cathedral was the largest building of Tangier and has been described as "a spur for Spain to assert revenge on other colonial powers for all the humiliations inflicted on the Spaniards in the past" – even though, somewhat ironically, the independence of Morocco made the vision of a Spanish-dominated Tangier irrelevant by the time the building was completed.

The completed cathedral became the seat of the newly established Archdiocese of Tangier that had replaced the Apostolic Vicariate in late 1956. The 45-meter-high spire of its bell tower dominated the skyline of Tangier until the construction of the nearby Mohammed V Mosque, dedicated in 1983.

== Art ==
The cathedral's stained glass windows stand out, including three panes in the apse often attributed to Alicante artist Arcadi Blasco, and the other abstract windows by José María de Labra.

The cathedral also hosts a suspended crucifix and other works carved by sculptor José Luis Sánchez Fernández.

== Burials ==
The remains of Father Lerchundi rest in an underground crypt under the church.

== Gallery ==
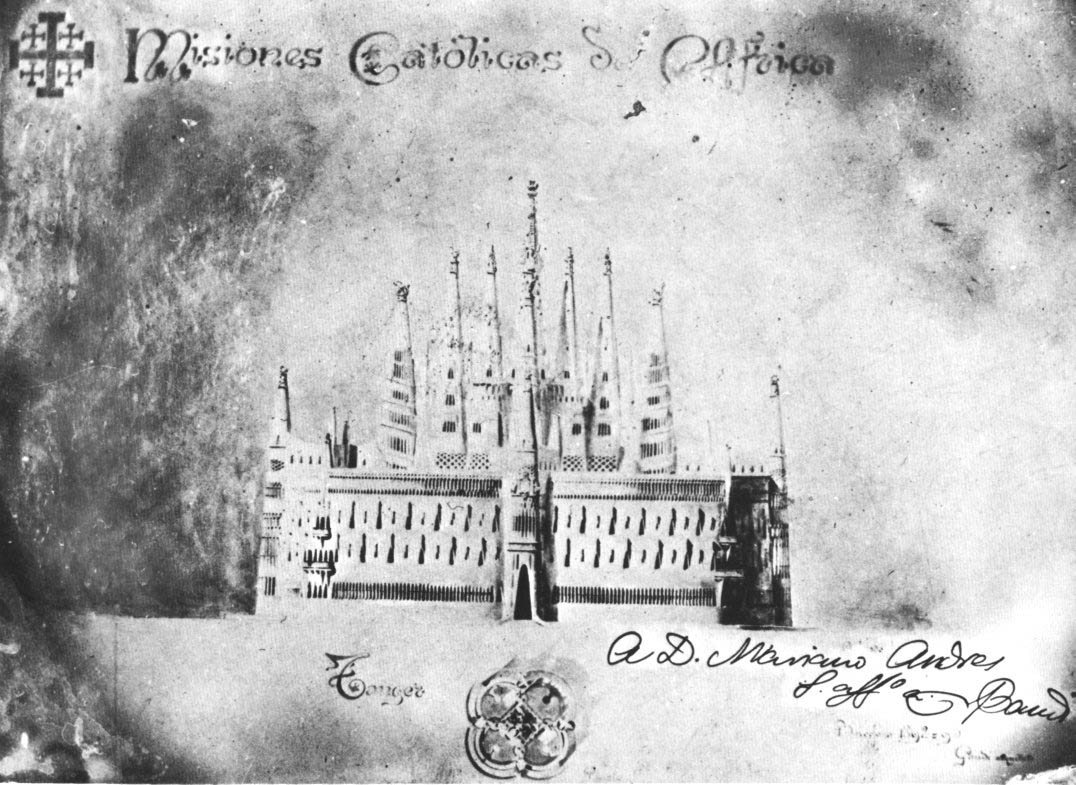
Antoni Gaudí's 1893 design for the Franciscan convent

Apse exterior

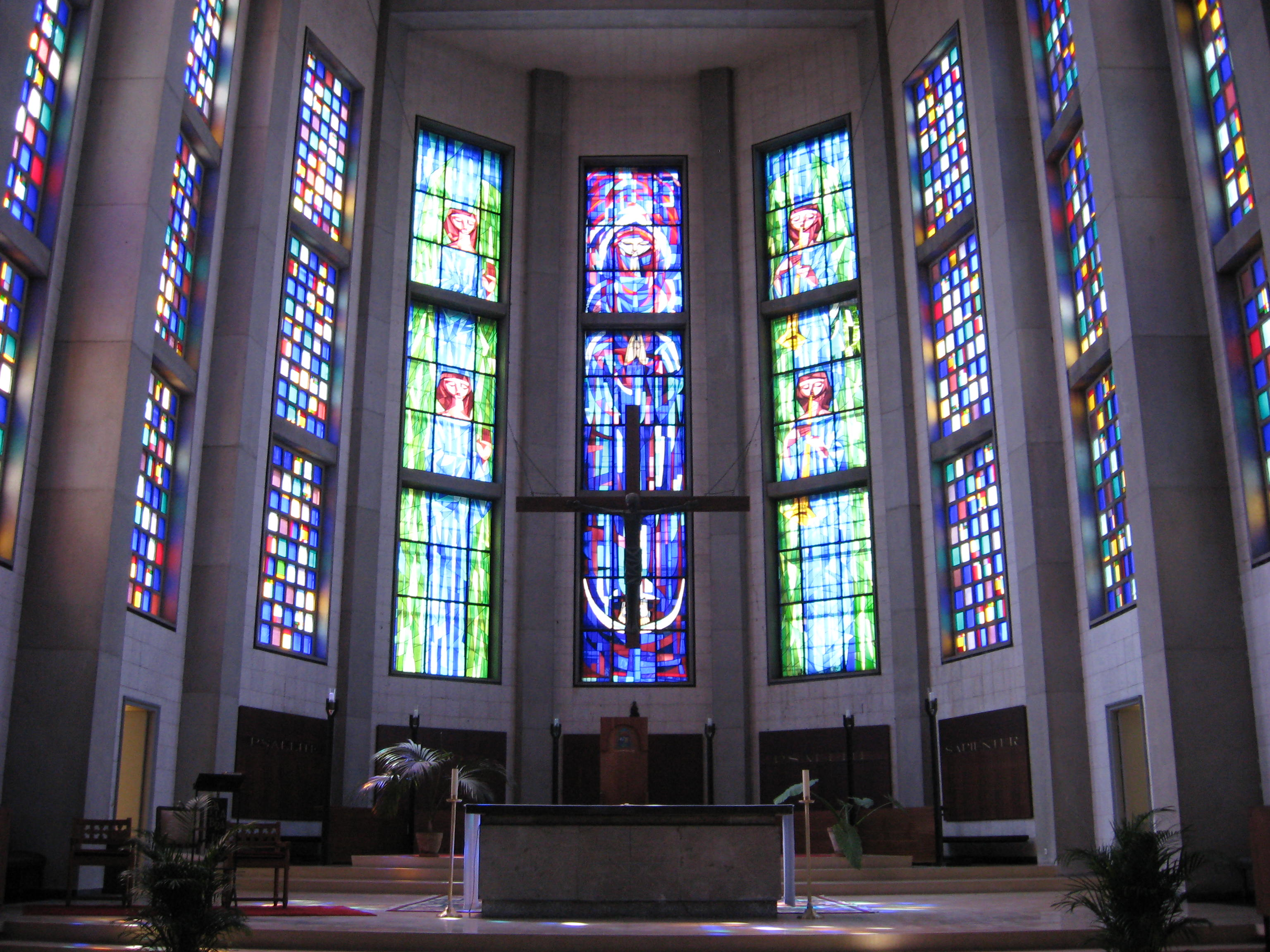
Stained glass windows in the apse

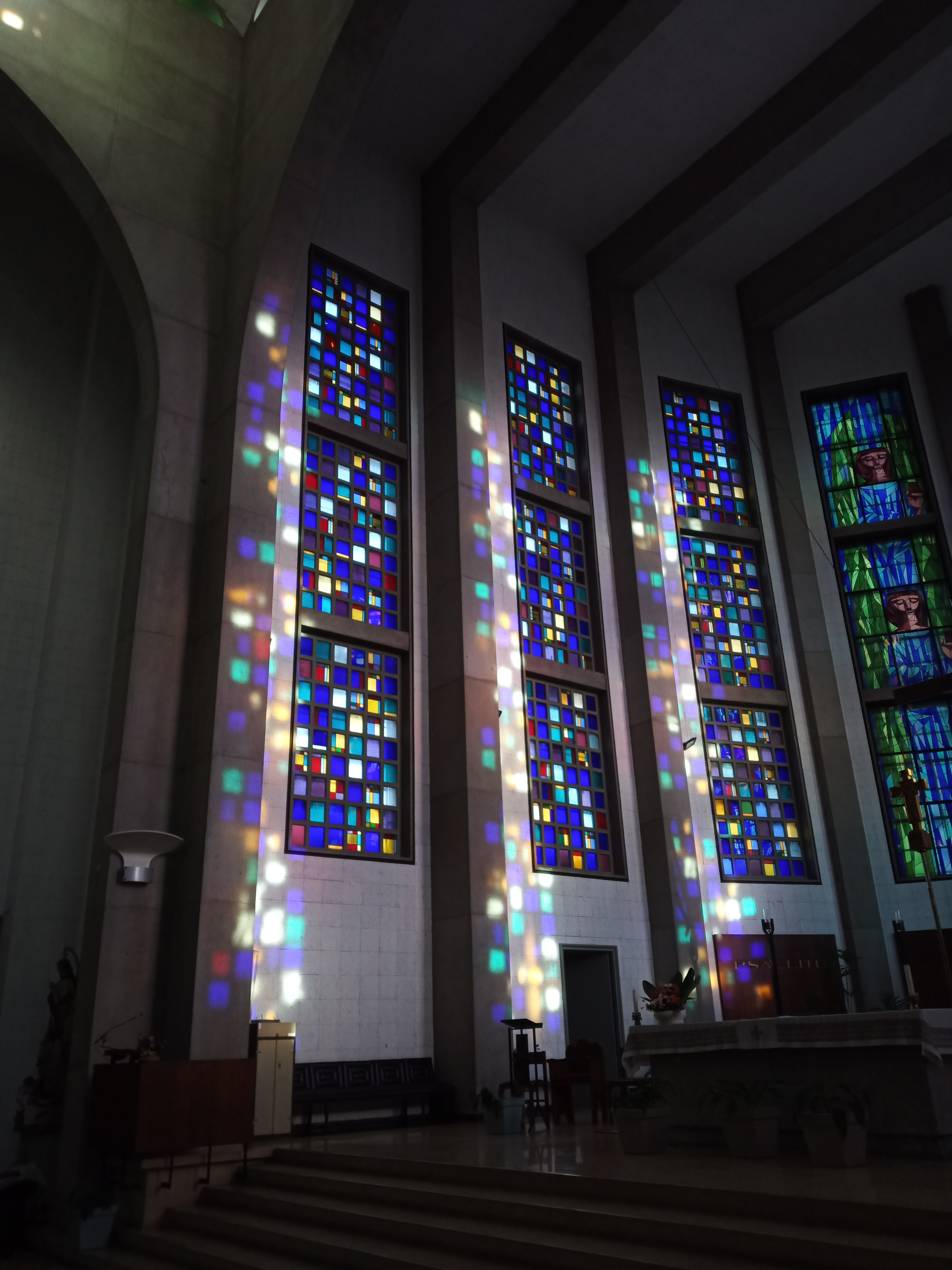
Side windows

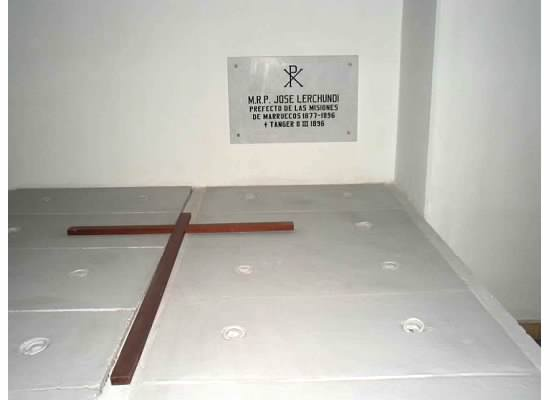
Memorial plaque of José María Lerchundi in the crypt

== See also ==
- French Church of Tangier
- Our Lady of Mount Carmel Church, Dakhla
- Roman Catholicism in Morocco
