= Le Réveil du Maroc =

Le Réveil du Maroc (in English: "The Moroccan Awakening") was a francophone newspaper published by Abraham Lévy-Cohen in Tangier, Morocco, from 1883 to 1903. It was the first francophone newspaper in Morocco. It served French and Jewish interests in Morocco and it was published under Jewish management and ownership, though it did not describe itself as a Jewish journal.

== History ==
Le Réveil du Maroc was first published on July 14, 1883—Bastille Day—in honor of France. In response to critical coverage of the Makhzen (Moroccan governing authority) in Le Réveil du Maroc and other publications from Tangier, the Moroccan authorities attempted to suppress the press in Tangier, though these efforts were unsuccessful.

When Lévy-Cohen died in 1888, Haïm Benchimol assumed control of the paper.

== Editorial line ==
The editorial line of Le Réveil du Maroc has been described as supportive of French and Jewish interests and critical of the Makhzen.

Although the paper's founder and publisher Abraham Lévy-Cohen was a naturalized subject of the British crown, he was a member of the Francophilic Jewish elite of Morocco and the paper "strongly supported France." As the paper served the French Legation in Tangier, it paid Lévy-Cohen a subsidy. He also received funding from other French sources, such as the count of Chavagnac and the Banque Transatlantique, which was represented in Tangier by Haïm Benchimol.

The paper also advocated for Jewish causes, such as the Demnat affair of 1884, in which the Jewish population of Demnat appealed to Western organizations in Tangier for support against the abuses of the Qaid al-Jīlālī b. ‘Alī al-Damnātī, leading to Sultan Hassan I to order the construction of a mellah with five synagogues and high walls, completed 1894. The newspaper also spoke out against antisemitism in the European community in Tangier. It responded to La France juive, an 1886 antisemitic publication by Édouard Drumont that attacked what it described as the "evil influence" of Jews and especially Benchimol on the French Legation in Tangier.

Le Réveil du Maroc also criticized the Makhzen. In 1886, the Makhzen demanded the suppression of the European press in Tangier, though this was unsuccessful.

== See also ==
- List of newspapers in Morocco
- Mass media in Morocco
