= French Consulate General, Tangier =

Diplomatic representation and building in Tangier

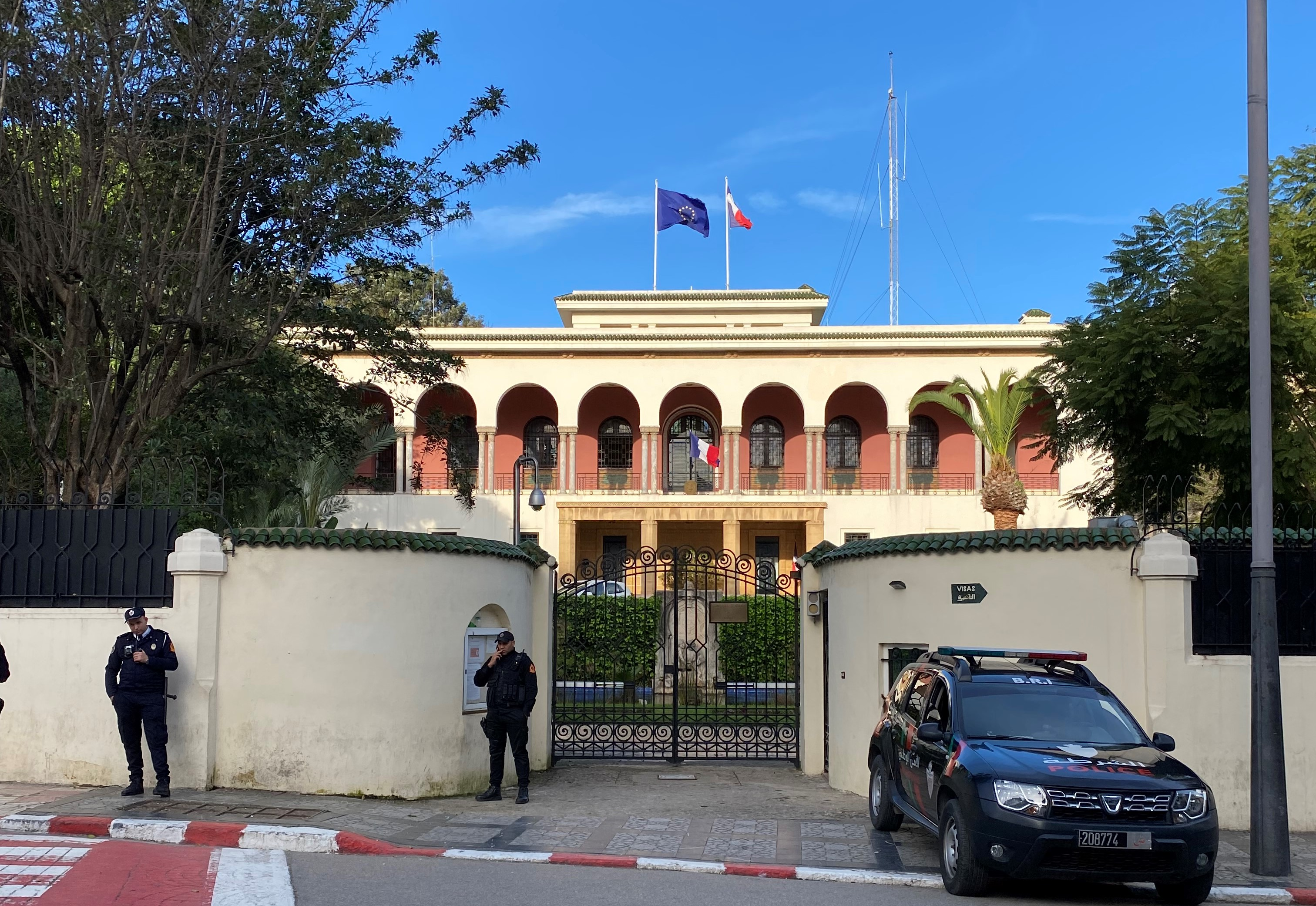
The consulate-general's current chancery, completed in 1928

The French Consulate General in Tangier is one of the consular representations of the French Republic in Morocco. It has a rich history linked to Tangier's past role as diplomatic capital of the Sultanate of Morocco from the late 18th to the 20th centuries.

== Background ==
France had continuous diplomatic representation in the Sultanate of Morocco, from Guillaume Bérard in 1582 to 1718 when the activity of Barbary pirates operating from Morocco's port cities led to a suspension of the relationship. It restarted with a treaty of 30 May 1767 which provided for a permanent consular representation in a Moroccan port city of France's choosing. Louis de Chénier, the first consul of that new era, established himself in 1768 in Rabat, then known as "New Salé", and stayed in Morocco until 1782, by which time he had moved the consulate to Tangier.

== History ==
The next French representative arrived in Tangier in 1794, and the French consulate was formally established there on 22 October 1796. Michel-Ange d'Ornano, a Corsican parent of Napoleon, was consul-general from 1807 to 1814 following diplomats of lesser rank.

In 1816, the consulate moved into an existing building on Rue Es-Siaghine, between the Medina's gate of Bab el-Fahs and the Petit Socco square, with a portal dating back to era of Portuguese Tangier. Eugène Delacroix resided there in 1832 as he was traveling in Morocco together with ambassador Charles-Edgar de Mornay. France eventually purchased the building in 1845, and elevated the consulate to a legation in 1846.

In 1848, Denmark closed its consulate in Tangier and entrusted the representation of its interests to the United Kingdom. France acquired the vacant former Danish property, a few blocks norths from rue es-Siaghine, and moved its own legation there in 1849, while selling its previous building to the Moroccan state that made it the residence of the Naib or representative of the Sultan to the foreign communities in Tangier, thus subsequently known as Dar Niaba. Around 1905, the French legation moved again to a rented building next to the Hôtel Villa de France. That new building, still standing but altered since then, had been designed by architect Paul Guadet for local businessman Haim Benchimol, who had been an interpreter for the French legation in the past.

Following the creation in 1912 of the French protectorate in Morocco, the representation in Tangier was downgraded back to a consulate, as Morocco was still nominally sovereign but practically governed by the French Resident-General in Rabat. After the establishment of the Tangier International Zone in 1923, the French government decided to build more imposing premises, next to a villa it had purchased years before that served as the consul's private residence. The new building, also known as the "Maison de France" (lit. 'House of France'), was designed by local architects Gaston Raulin and Maurice Duché, and built by the firm of Desforges & Rousseau. It was completed in late 1928 under consul Pierre de Witasse.

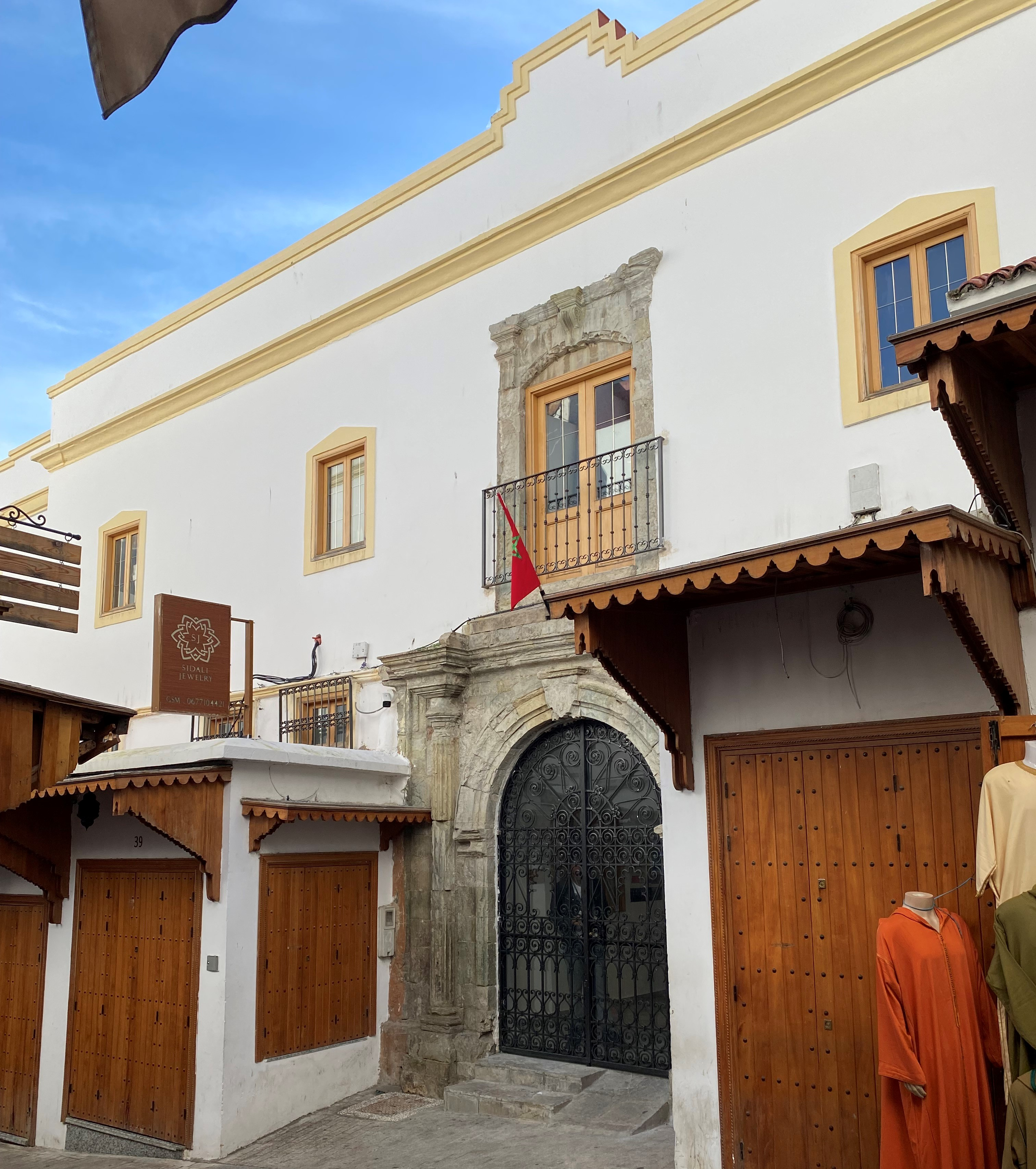
Building on rue Es-Siaghine, French consulate from 1816 to 1849, later known as Dar Niaba

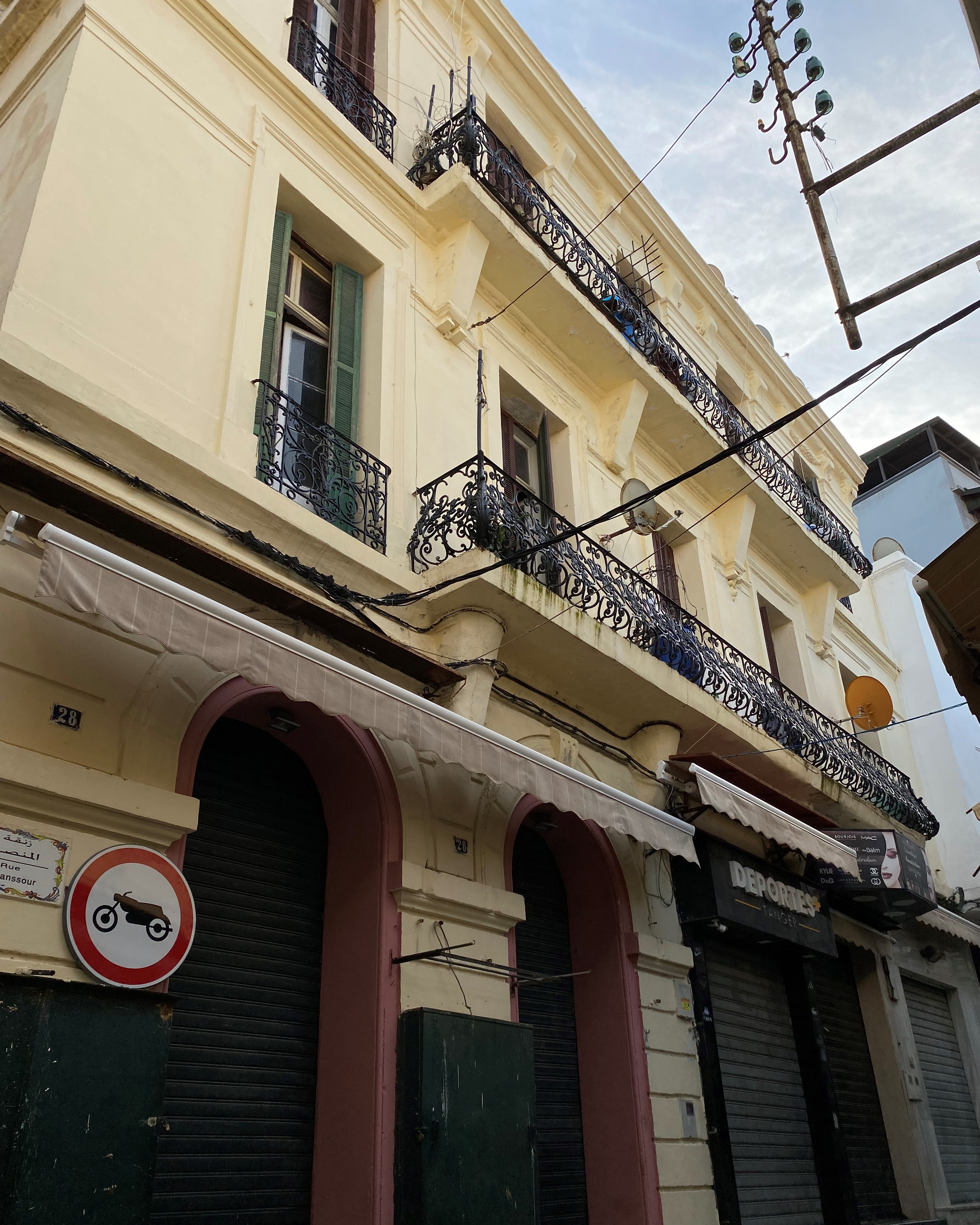
20th-century building erected on the site where the French consulate stood in the second half of the 19th century

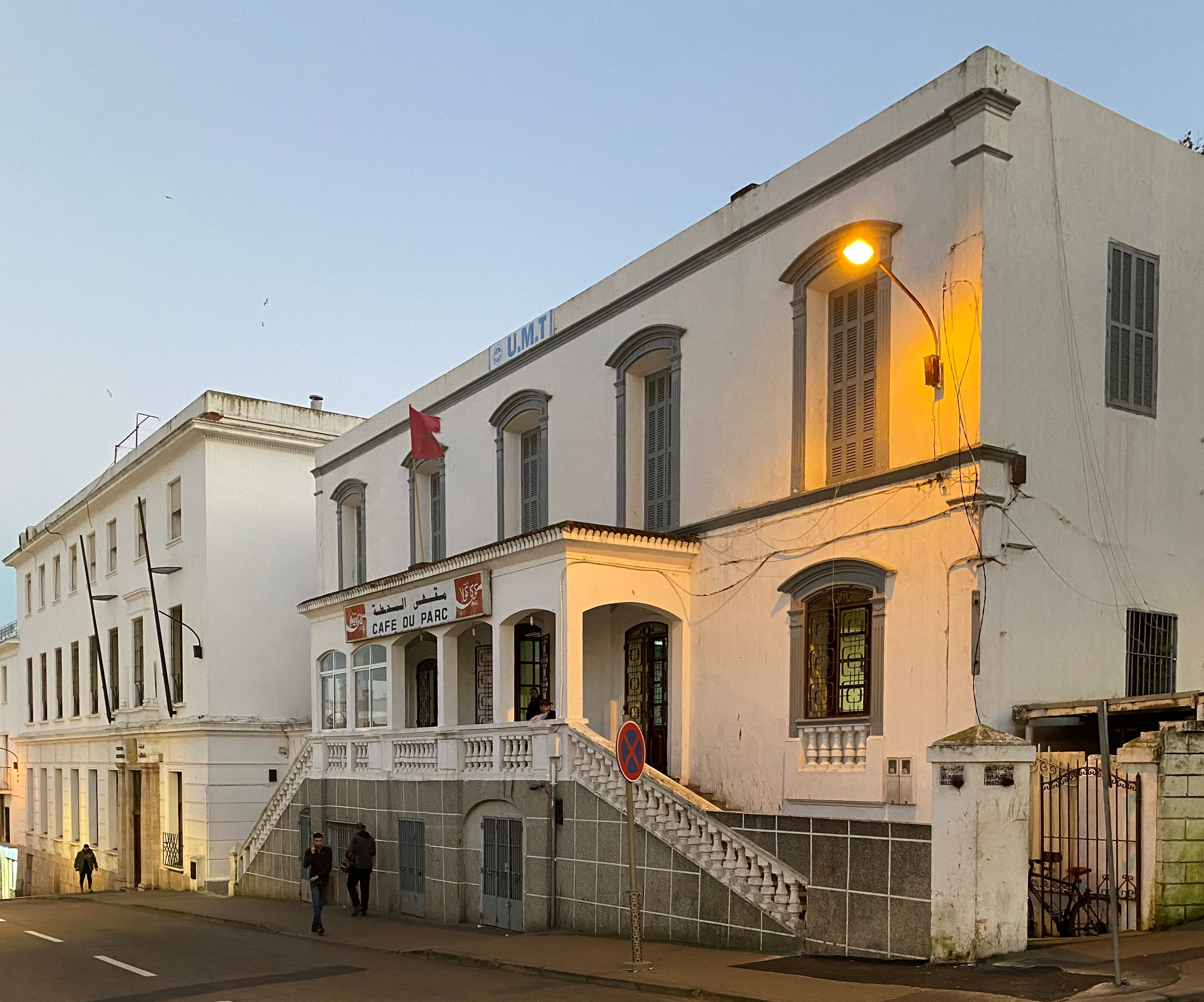
Building on rue d'Amérique du Sud, French consulate ca. 1905-1928 (altered since then)

== See also ==
- France–Morocco relations
- American Legation, Tangier
- Mendoubia
