= Naib (disambiguation) =

Naib نائب is an Arabic word for 'Deputy' or 'Representative of Authority'. Examples of use include:

- the holder of the office of Dar Niaba, diplomatic representative of the Sultan of Morocco in Tangier from the 1840s to 1924
- Naib, a ruler of Massawa who acted as a viceroy to the Ottoman caliphate
- Naib, a local leader in Dagestan during the Caucasian Imamate
- Naib, a leader of a Fremen community in Frank Herbert's Dune universe

NAIB may also refer to:

- National Association of Intercollegiate Basketball, predecessor entity of the National Association of Intercollegiate Athletics's from 1940 to 1952
