= Church of the Immaculate Conception (Tangier) =

Catholic church in Tangier, Morocco

Coordinates: 35.78528°N 5.81137°W

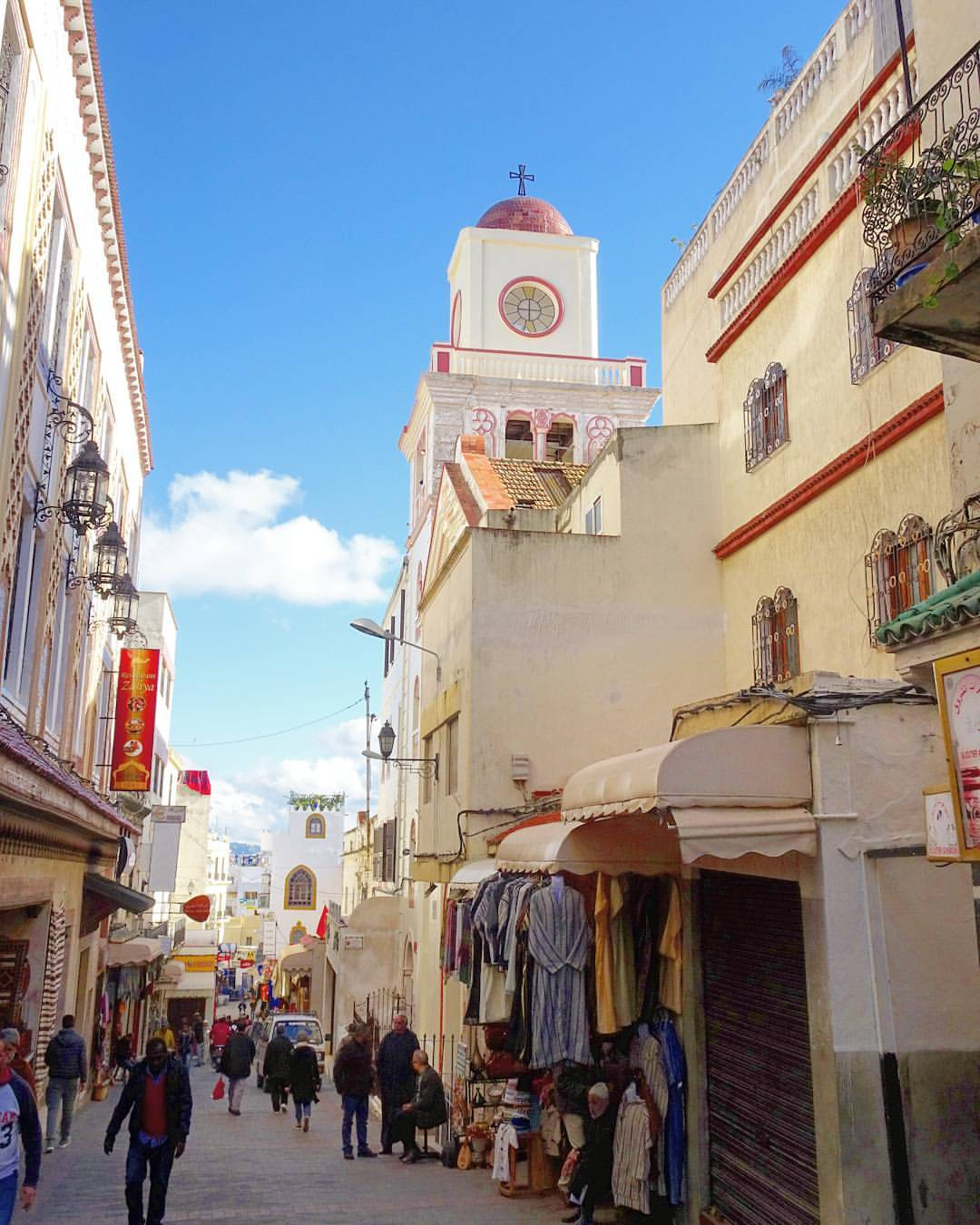
- The church viewed from Rue Es-Siaghine

Religion
- Affiliation: Roman Catholic Church
- Status: Active

Location
- Location: Tangier, Morocco
- Interactive map of Church of the Immaculate Conception

Architecture
- Architect: Manuel Aníbal Álvarez Amoroso
- Groundbreaking: 1880
- Completed: 1881

The Church of the Immaculate Conception, also known as the Spanish Church or La Purísima, is a Roman Catholic church built in 1880–1881 in Tangier, Morocco.

== Overview ==
The church is located on Rue Es-Siaghine, just west of the Petit Socco square at the center of the Tangier medina. It stands on the former ground of the Swedish legation, which had been established there in 1788. It was designed by architect Manuel Aníbal Álvarez Amoroso on the initiative of Spanish Franciscan father José María Lerchundi. Construction started in October 1880, with funding from the Spanish government and the Obra Pía. It was complemented in 1892-93 by the edification of a clock tower, originally topped with a spire and later changed to the present-day cupola. The church initially served the whole city's Catholic community, including European diplomats.

More recently, the property has been used by the Missionaries of Charity who in 1996 altered its interior, partitioning the former church nave into two floors.

== See also ==
- Roman Catholic Cathedral of Tangier
- French Church of Tangier
