= Tanjazz =

Jazz festival in Tangier, Morocco

Coordinates: 35°46′N 5°48′W

Tanjazz is an international jazz festival held annually in Tangier, Morocco since the year 2000. The event typically has drawn a capacity crowd.

== See also ==
- Abdelhafid Palace
