= Haim Benchimol =

Jewish community leader in Tangier

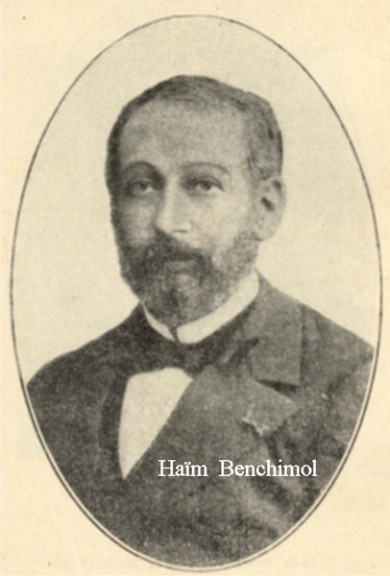
Photograph of Haim Benchimol in Isaac Laredo's memoir Memorias de un Viejo Tangerino, 1935

Haim Benchimol (1826 or 1834 - 1906) was a Moroccan businessman, newspaper publisher, Jewish community leader and philanthropist in Tangier, Morocco. In 1904 he founded the Benchimol Hospital, at the time one of Tangier's main hospital facilities, which remained in activity until 2002.

== Biography ==
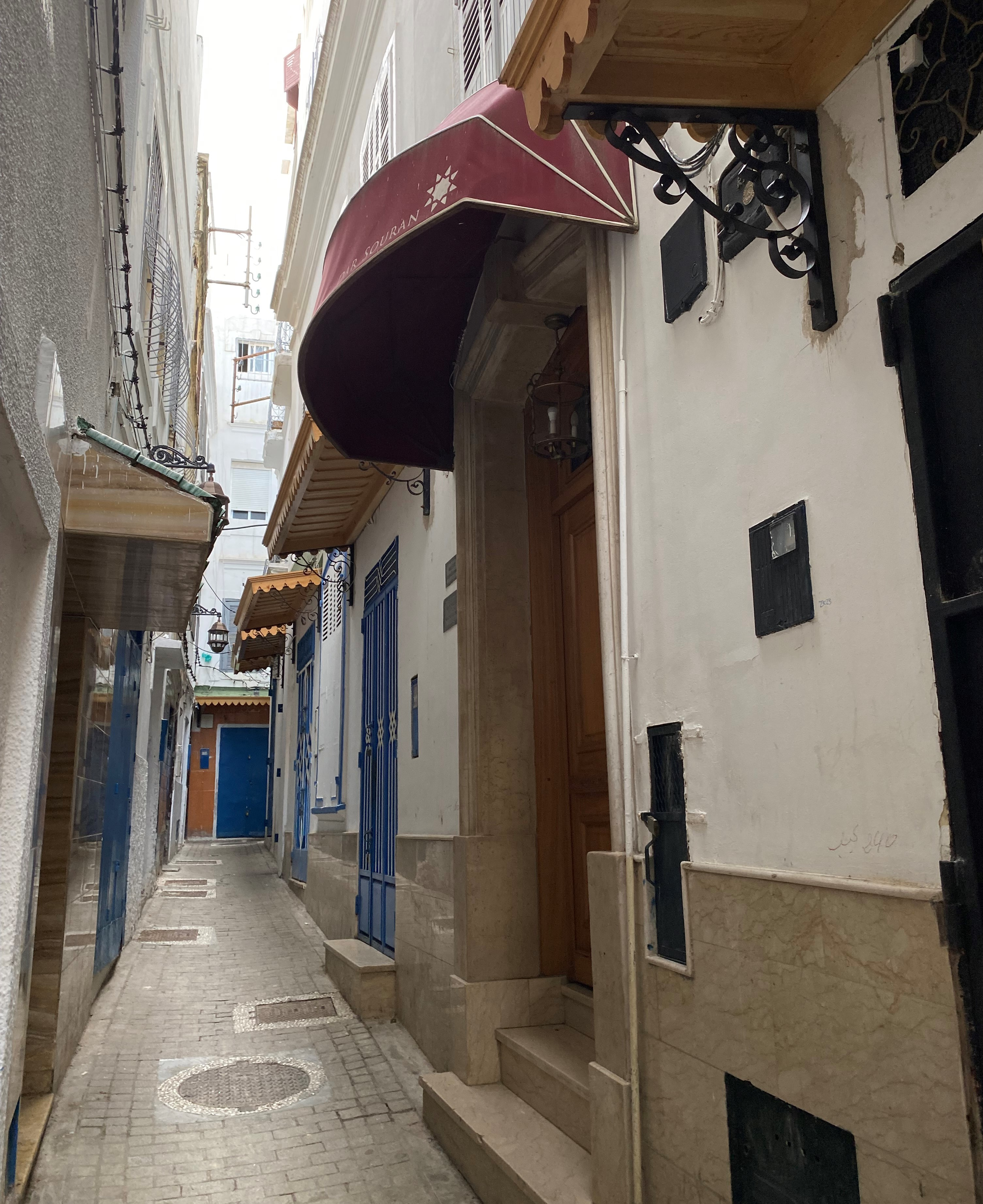
Portal of the former site of the Banque Transatlantique in Tangier

Haim Benchimol was born in Tangier, the son of Abraham Benchimol and Saada née Sicsu. In 1856 he married Donna (sometimes Doña) Toledano, from another prominent Jewish family in Tangier. Benchimol was involved in numerous businesses, and by the late 19th century was among the richest members of the Tangier Jewish community. Like other members of his family, he also served as an interpreter and dragoman for the French legation in Tangier, for which he was awarded protégé status. He later became the first-ever native Moroccan to become a naturalized French citizen, and was awarded the Legion of Honour in 1884 for his services to the French diplomatic mission. In his 1886 anti-Semitic polemic La France juive, Edouard Drumont accused Benchimol of being the "true master" of the French diplomatic delegation in Tangier, implying he was able to manipulate it to support Jewish and Masonic interests.

From 1881, he was the manager of the Tangier branch of the Banque Transatlantique, which had just been created in Paris by Eugène Pereire. In 1889, he transformed the branch into an independent bank of the same name. In 1896, Benchimol's Transatlantic Bank became a subsidiary of the Comptoir national d'escompte de Paris, which in turn was taken over by the State Bank of Morocco upon its creation in 1907.

Benchimol was entrepreneurially involved in Freemasonry, the Moroccan Jewish community, and the advocacy of European and especially French intervention to modernize Morocco. In 1867, he founded the masonic lodge L'Union 194, the first created in Morocco, affiliated with the Grande Loge de France. He was the longstanding chair of the Tangier committee of the Alliance Israélite Universelle. In 1888, he purchased the newspaper Le Réveil du Maroc, the first French-language newspaper in Morocco, following the death of its previous editor Abraham Lévy-Cohen, which he had previously supported financially through the Banque Transatlantique. Benchimol also served as a local correspondent for La France, a Paris-based financial daily, and for the Havas news agency. In 1890 he took over the Jewish community committee in Tangier, known as the Junta, after having set up a rival reformist group that was nicknamed the "Benchimol Junta". By 1896, he was one of the members of Tangier's Hygiene Commission.

Benchimol died during a trip in Marseille on 18 August 1906. The Donna and Haim Benchimol Foundation, which perpetuates his memory, was among the donors of the renovation of the Beit Yehuda Synagogue in the medina of Tangier and its repurposing as a Jewish museum.

== Benchimol Hospital ==
Following the death of his wife Donna on 31 October 1903, Haim Benchimol endowed a modern Jewish hospital in her memory in 1904, subsequently known as the Benchimol Hospital (French: hôpital Benchimol). The hospital's main mission was to provide free medical care to Jews of modest means who could not afford medical care for themselves; it sometimes provided medical care to poor Muslims as well.

The Benchimol Hospital continued to operate decades after the death of its founder, treating thousands of patients every year until it closed in 2002. The hospital building stood until April 2010, when it was demolished by the Moroccan authorities, 105 years after its establishment. This step provoked much criticism among preservationist and Jewish circles in Morocco and abroad.

== See also ==
- Salomon Benaioun
- History of Moroccan Jews
