= Fondation Lorin =

Coordinates: 35°47′4.17″N 5°48′42.71″W

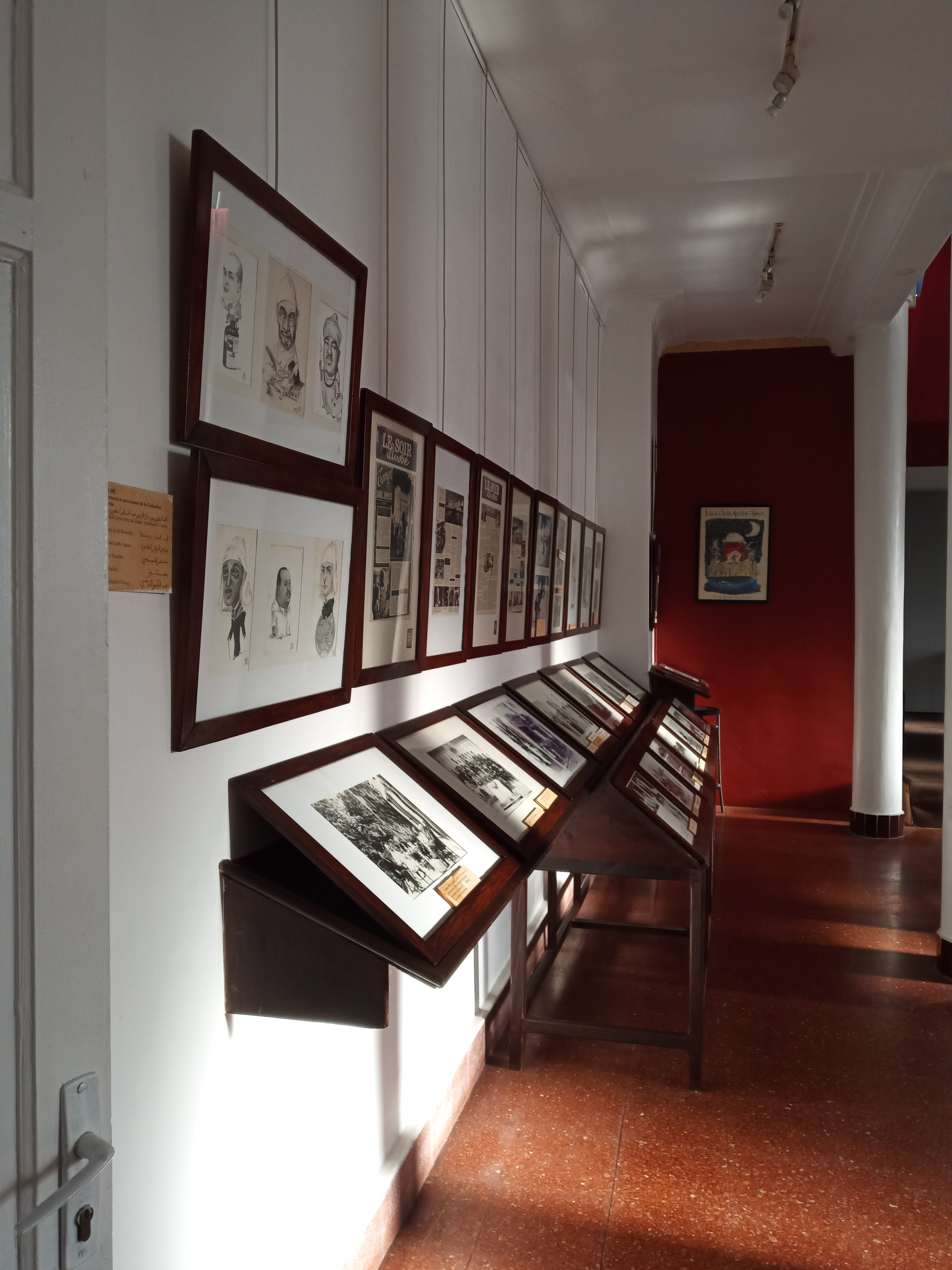
- Exhibition room
- Established: 1994
- Location: 44 Rue Es-Siaghine, Tangier, Morocco
- Type: art museum
- Collections: newspapers, photographs, posters and plans related to the political, sporting, musical and social history of Tangier
- Founder: Philippe Lorin

Fondation Lorin is an art museum located on the Rue Es-Siaghine in Tangier, Morocco. It is housed in a former synagogue, described as one of the oldest synagogues in the city. It is located near the Grand Socco and Mendoubia Gardens. Since 1994, it is housed in an old synagogue, and displays items such as newspapers, photographs, posters and plans related to the political, sporting, musical and social history of Tangier since the 1930s. It also has a number of contemporary paintings, and exhibitions are regularly held at the Fondation Lorin.

== History and collections ==
The museum was established in 1994 in a former synagogue, the Rabbi Mordechai Bengio Synagogue, in the medina of Tangier. Its collections include old photographs of Tangier, newspapers, posters and other materials documenting the city's social and cultural history. It also displays contemporary paintings and hosts temporary exhibitions.
