= Abraham Lévy-Cohen =

Moroccan journalist

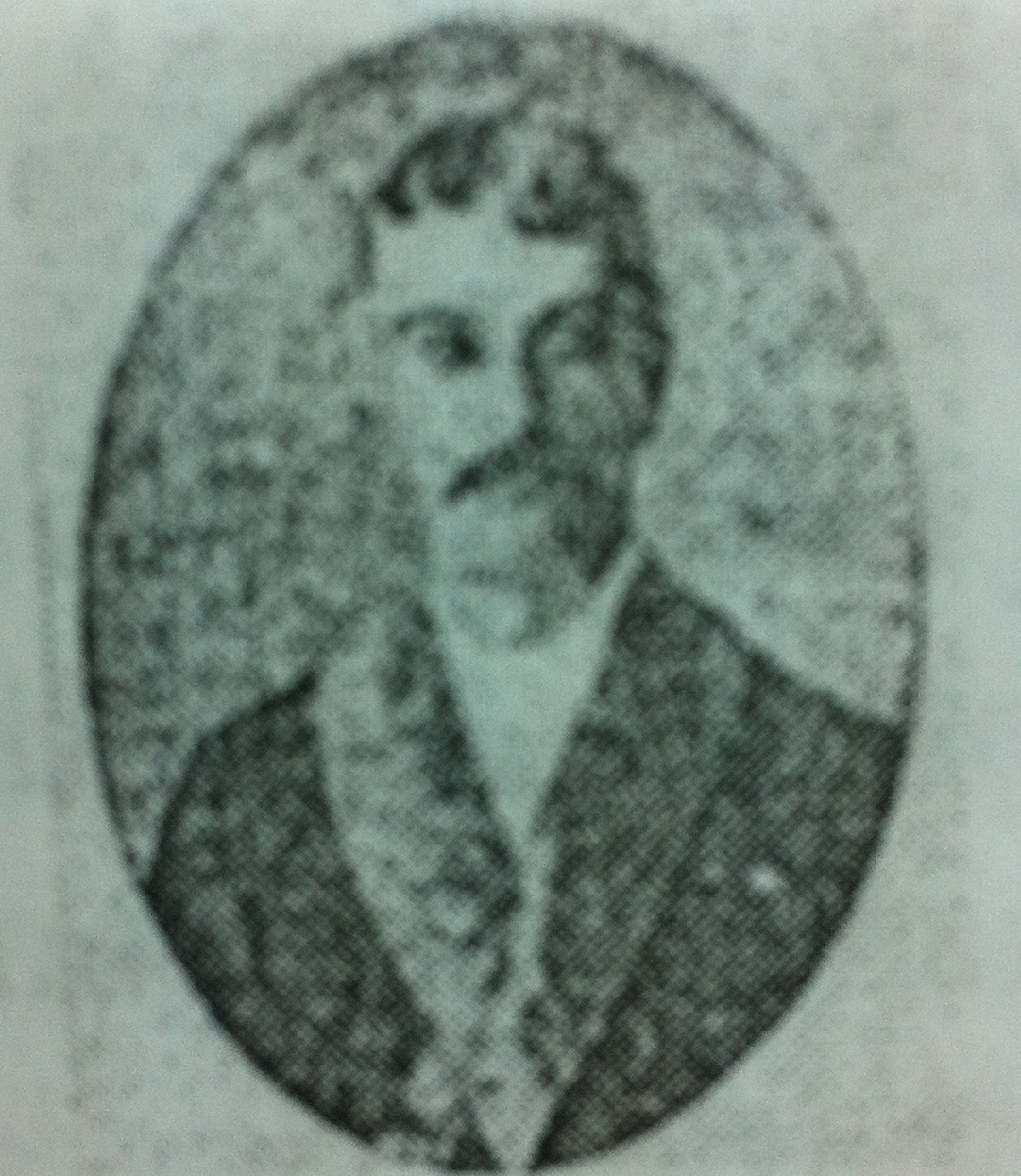
Abraham Lévy-Cohen

Abraham Lévy-Cohen (Hebrew: אברהם לוי-כהן; 1844–1888) was a Moroccan lawyer, businessman, and journalist. He founded Le Réveil du Maroc in 1883, the first francophone newspaper in Morocco.

== Biography ==
Abraham Lévy-Cohen was born to a Jewish family in Tangier in 1844 and raised in Essaouira (Mogador). He was educated in England and became a naturalized British citizen. He also spent eight years in France. He returned to Morocco and worked as a lawyer, a businessman, and a journalist, in addition to serving as a member of the Tangier regional committee of the Alliance Israélite Universelle, a member of the Freemasons, and a representative of the Anglo-Jewish Association in Tangier. He also served as a correspondent for Jewish newspapers based in London, such as The Jewish Chronicle and The Jewish World. Although he was a naturalized subject of the British crown, he was a member of the Francophilic Jewish elite of Morocco, and worked to further French culture and interests in Morocco.

On 14 July 1883 he began publishing the first francophone newspaper in Morocco: Le Reveil du Maroc.

== See also ==
- Haim Benchimol
