= Beit Yehuda Synagogue =

Former synagogue, now Jewish museum, in Tangier, Morocco

Coordinates: 35°47′7.82″N 5°48′40.83″W

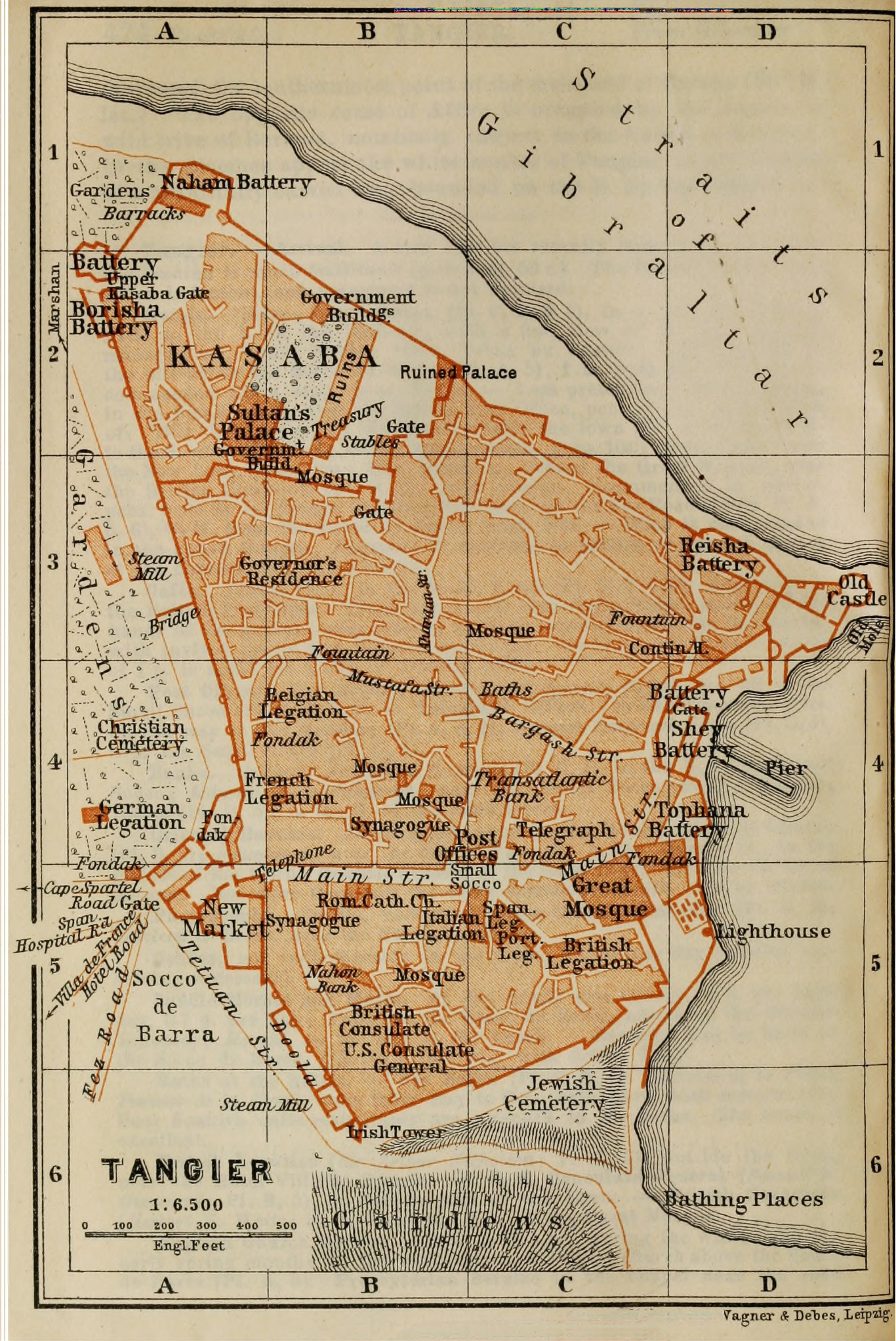
- 1901 Baedeker map of Tangier, showing the synagogue just north of rue Es-Siaghine ("Main Street")

Religion
- Affiliation: Judaism (former)
- Ecclesiastical or organisational status: Synagogue (1890–c. 1950s); Jewish museum (since 2022)
- Status: Closed (as a synagogue); Repurposed

Location
- Location: Tangier
- Country: Morocco
- Interactive map of Beit Yehuda Synagogue

Architecture
- Type: Synagogue architecture
- Completed: 1890

The Beit Yehuda Synagogue (Hebrew: בית הכנסת בית יהודה, romanized: Beit Knesset Beit Yehuda), also known as Assayag Synagogue (Arabic: كنيس الصياغ, romanized: Kanīs al-Ṣyāgh), is a former Jewish congregation and synagogue, located in Tangier, Morocco. The synagogue was completed in 1890.

Last used as a synagogue in the c. 1950s, the building has housed the Jewish Museum of Tangier, a Jewish museum and cultural landmark, since 2022.

== Overview ==
Unlike other Moroccan cities, Tangier had no walled Jewish quarter or mellah. Even so, its synagogues were clustered in a neighborhood on the southwestern side of the medina, known as Beni Idder for the family that initiated its development.

The Beit Yehuda Synagogue was founded in 1890 slightly north of Beni Idder on the other side of rue Es-Siaghine. It remained in service until the late 1950s. It was then abandoned for about six decades.

The former synagogue's revival as a museum was one of the cultural initiatives launched by the Moroccan government in the wake of the Israel–Morocco normalization agreement of December 2020. The renovation was led by architect Malika Laâroussi, and the creation of the museum by museographer Isabelle Timsit. The museum was inaugurated on 19 August 2022.

== See also ==
- History of the Jews in Morocco
- List of synagogues in Morocco
- Haim Benchimol
