= French Church of Tangier =

Church in Tangier, Morocco

Coordinates: 35.7747°N 5.8071°W

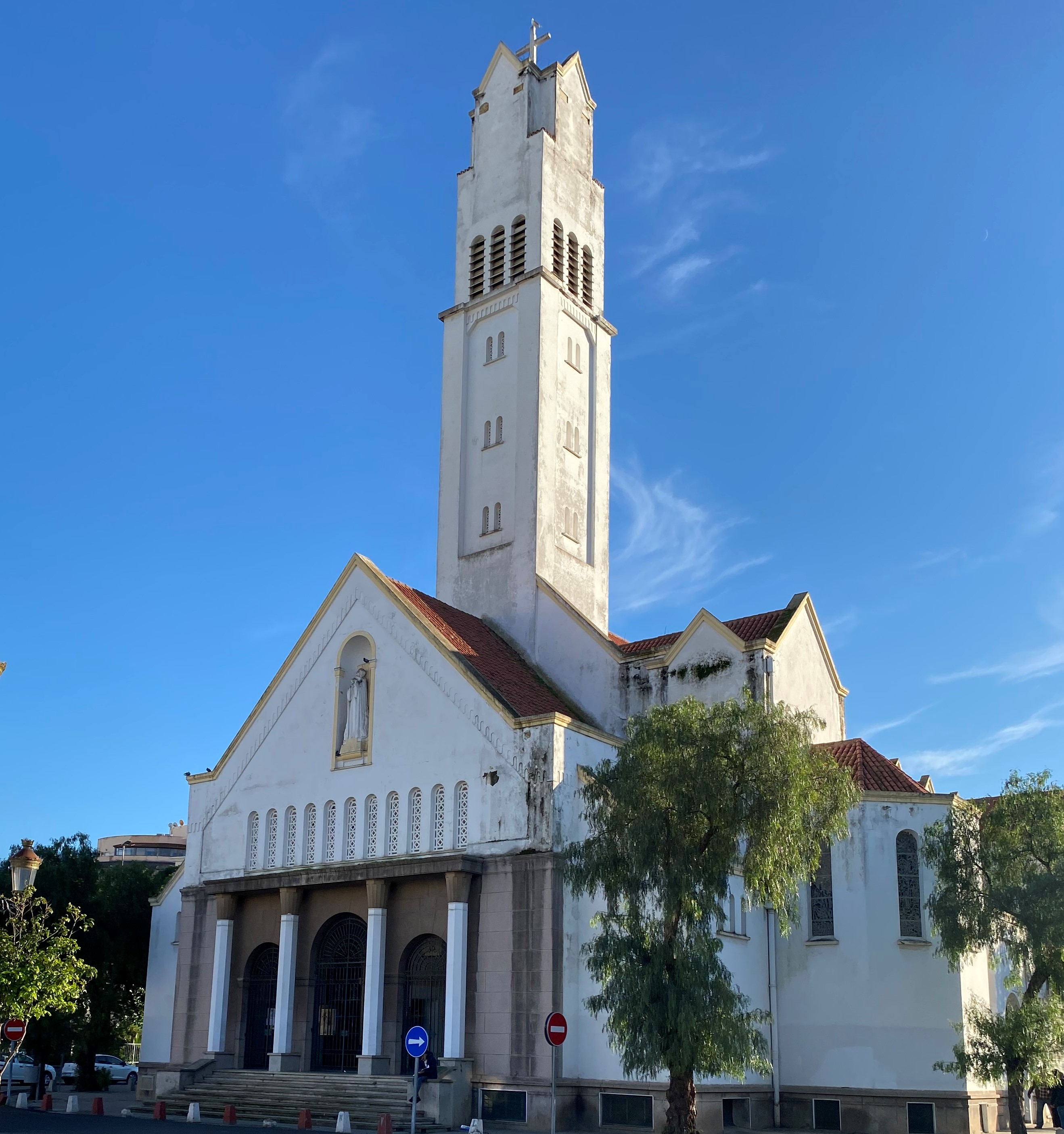
Front view of the church in 2022

The French Church of Tangier, formally the Church of Our Lady of the Assumption and of Saint Joan of Arc (French: Église Notre-Dame-de-l'Assomption et Sainte-Jeanne-d'Arc), also known as Sainte-Marie-Sainte-Jeanne-d'Arc, shorthand Sainte-Marie-Jeanne, or the Église des Sables (lit. 'Sands Church'), is a parish church in Tangier, Morocco. It was built in 1949–1953 for the French community in the Tangier International Zone.

== Overview ==
Fundraising for the church's construction started in 1925, but the project took time to come to fruition. It was eventually helped by the rivalry between the main national communities of Europeans in the Tangier International Zone, which led each nation to aim at maximizing its visibility in the public space of the city. Thus, Italy sponsored the construction of the Church of Saint Francis of Assisi, built in 1939–40 on the land of the former Abdelhafid Palace. The start of construction of the French Church in 1949, in turn, would stimulate the larger Spanish project which became the Roman Catholic Cathedral of Tangier, completed in 1961.

The French Church was also known as l'église des sables with reference to an earlier wooden church on a nearby site. It is located on a median ground in the middle of Omar Ibn al-Khattab Avenue (formerly rue Washington) in the Ville Nouvelle or 20th-century southern expansion of Tangier, off the neighborhood's main thoroughfare Mohammed V Avenue (formerly Boulevard Antée). It was initially standing alone, together with three nearby official buildings of the International Zone bordering rue Washington (the Administration, later Amalat then Wilaya of the Tangier region, the courthouse, and the seat of the State Bank of Morocco); the surrounding blocks were only developed in the 1960s and 1970s.

In December 1953, the completed church was dedicated to Our Lady of the Assumption and Joan of Arc by the Spanish archbishop of Tangier and his French counterpart in Rabat, respectively Francisco Aldegunde and Amédée Lefevbre. Its architectural style is art deco, with monumental stained glass windows created by artist Charles Plessard from 1951 to 1958. The statue of the Virgin Mary on the façade is the work of sculptor Albert Navarra.

The church was designated as a Moroccan protected heritage site by ministerial order of 9 March 2016.

French political leader Jean-Luc Mélenchon was an altar boy at the French Church during his childhood in Tangier.

== See also ==
- Church of the Immaculate Conception (Tangier)
- St Andrew's Church, Tangier
- Roman Catholic Cathedral of Tangier
