= Rue Es-Siaghine =

Historic thoroughfare in Tangier, Morocco

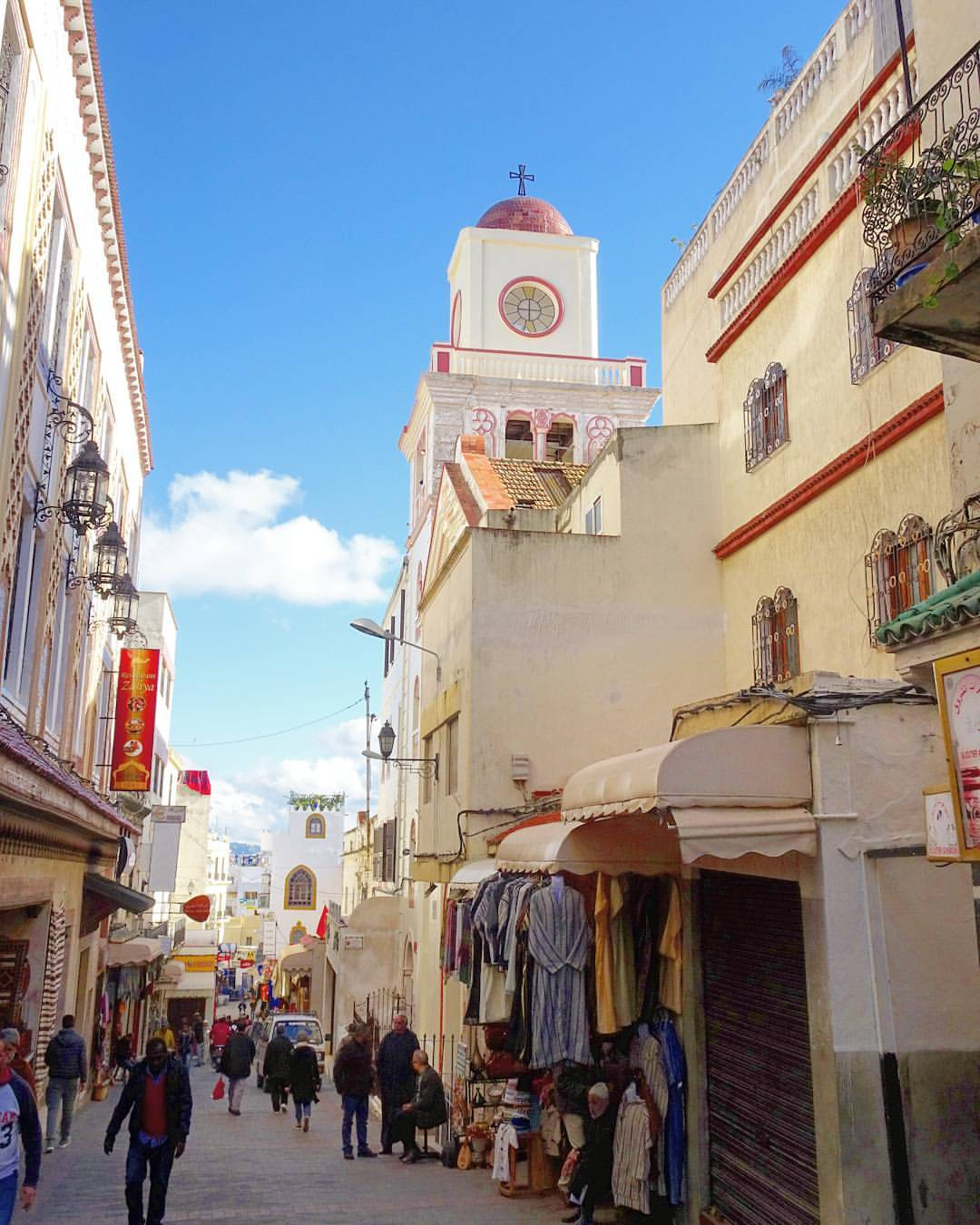
View towards the Petit Socco

Rue Es-Siaghine (Arabic: زنقة الصياغين, meaning Silversmith's Street, also transliterated as Rue Siaghin or Rue Siaghine) is a street in Tangier, Morocco. Under Roman rule it was the decumanus maximus, the main thoroughfare of the city. The street led to the harbor through the south gate. Today the street is lined with cafes, bars and souvenir shops, and leads down into the Petit Socco in the medina of Tangier.

== Buildings ==
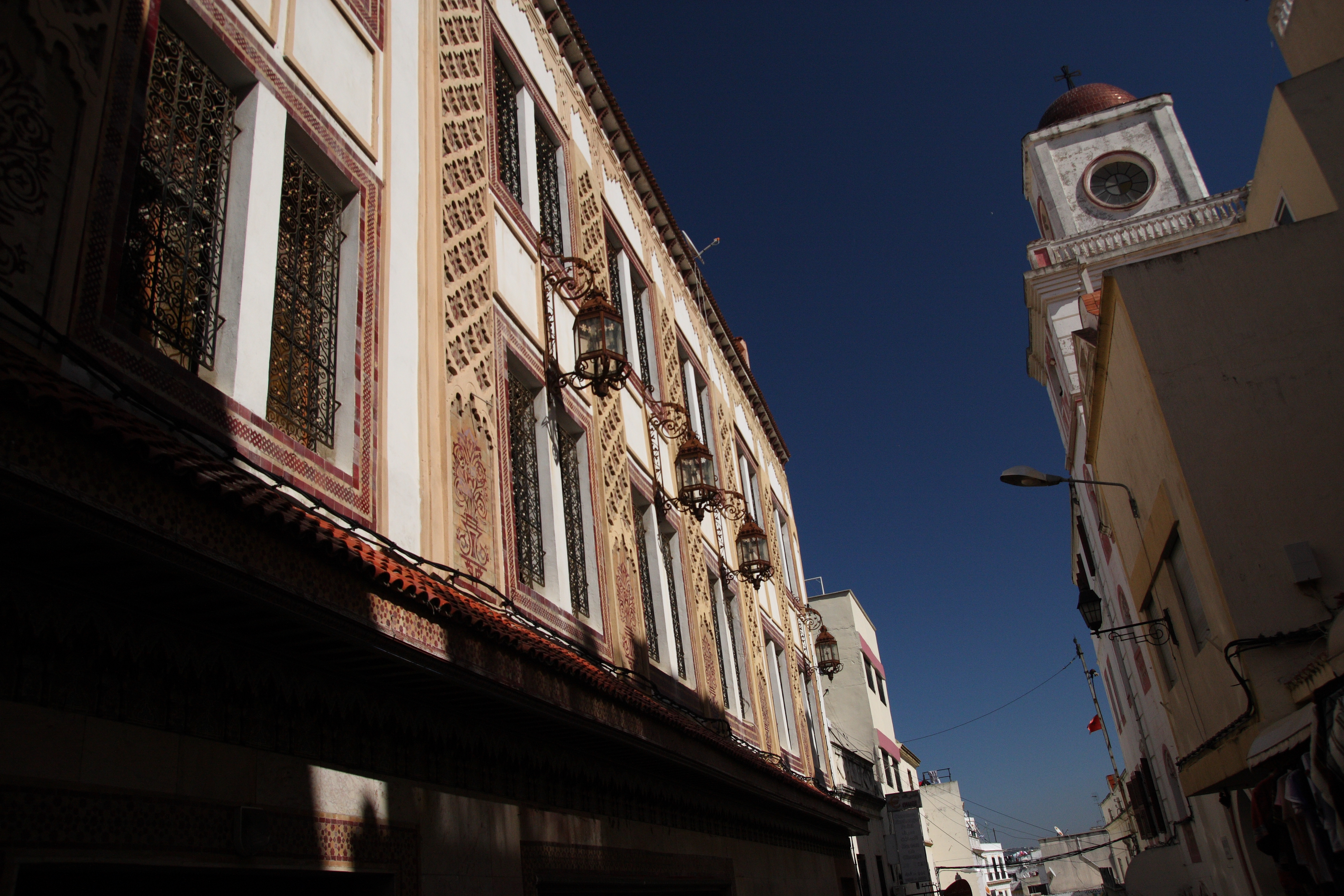
91 rue Siaghine building

- At No. 44 is the Fondation Lorin, an arts centre which is also located along the street with displays dating back to the 1930s.
- At No. 47 is Dar Niaba, a former administrative building noted for its courtyard growing oranges. From 1851 to 1920 the building served as the residence of the naib, the Moroccan high official who served as an intermediary between the sultan and foreign ambassadors.
- At No. 51 is the Church of the Immaculate Conception, which was built by the Spanish in the 1880s and became the centre of the Christian community in Tangier.
- At No. 58 is the Fondak Siaghine, a fondak built c. 1810. It is organized around a central courtyard encircled by a two-floor gallery with horseshoe arches.
- At No. 91 is the three-story structure built as retail shop in 1917 by the Jewish banker Moses Nahon. In 1951, it became a Monoprix, and eventually, a bazaar, selling handicrafts and antiques. Today is closed and for sale.

== See also ==
- Beit Yehuda Synagogue
