= Elisa Chimenti =

Elisa Chimenti (1883-1969) was an Italian-born author who recorded and translated the oral traditions of Moroccan women.

== Early life and education ==
Chimenti was born in Naples to Maria Luisa Ruggio Conti and Rosario Chimenti. Her family emigrated to Tunis in 1884 when she was an infant. Chimenti grew up studying multiple languages in a multicultural environment, as well as learning from multiple faith disciplines.

== Career ==
After the death of her father, Chimenti moved to Germany where she wrote two books and continue to study. After marrying in 1912, Chimenti returned to Morocco where she helped her mother open an Italian school in Tangier in 1914, and would go on to teach there for many years.

However, due to Mussolini gaining power years later, Chimenti was unable to continue running her school and became a full time journalist. Her writing centered largely around the people of Morocco, mainly women, as well as studying the different communities throughout Morocco.

== Works ==
- Meine Lieder, 1911
- Taitouma, 1913
- Èves Marocaines, 1935
- Chants de femmes arabes, 1942
- Légendes marocaines, 1950
- Les petits blancs marocains, 1950-1960
- Au cœur du harem, 1958
- Le sortilège (et autres contes séphardites), 1964
