= Gran Teatro Cervantes =

Coordinates: 35.7820°N 5.8107°W

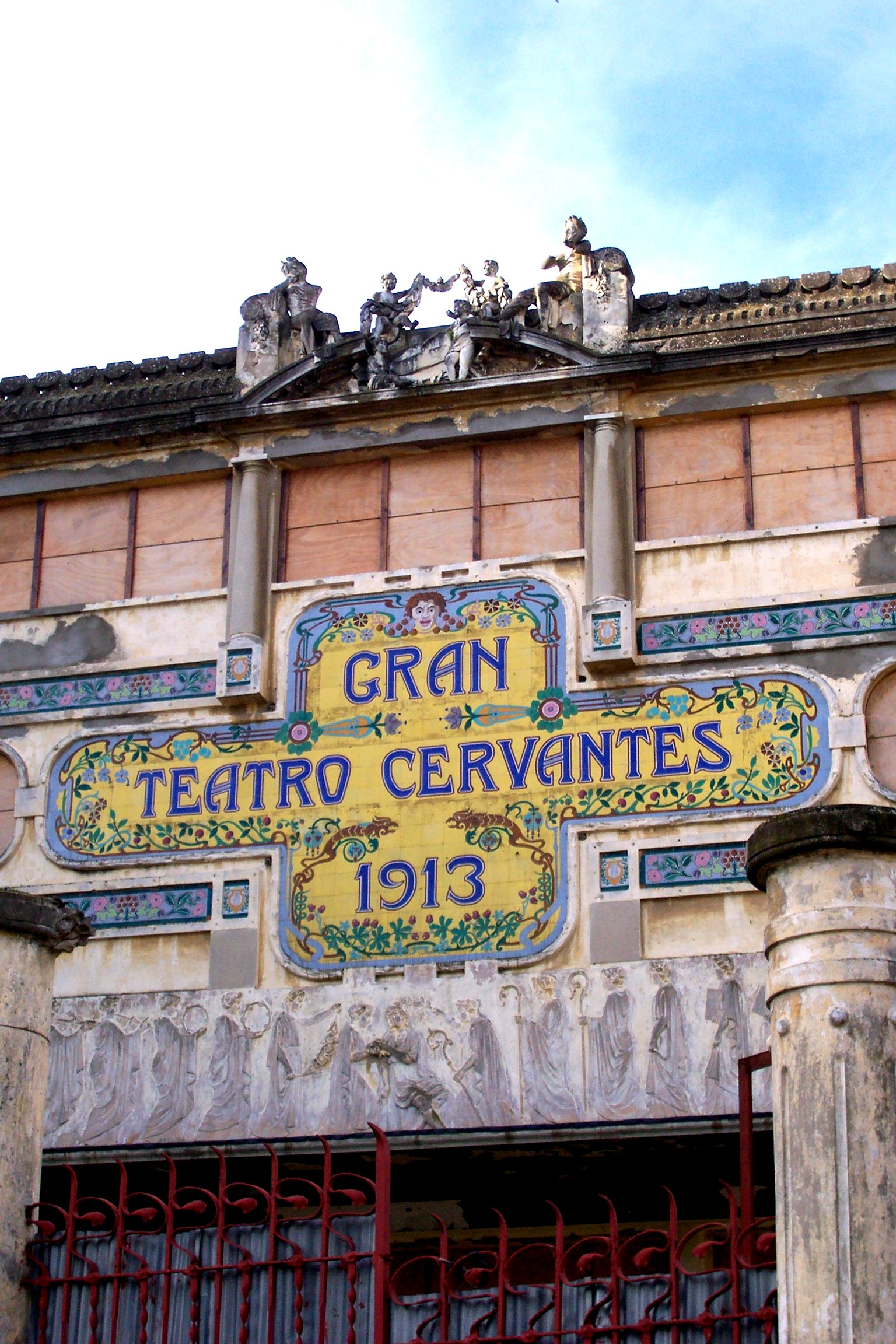
Gran Teatro Cervantes

Gran Teatro Cervantes is a theatre, dedicated to Miguel de Cervantes, in Tangier, Morocco. The theatre was built in 1913 by the Spanish.

== History ==
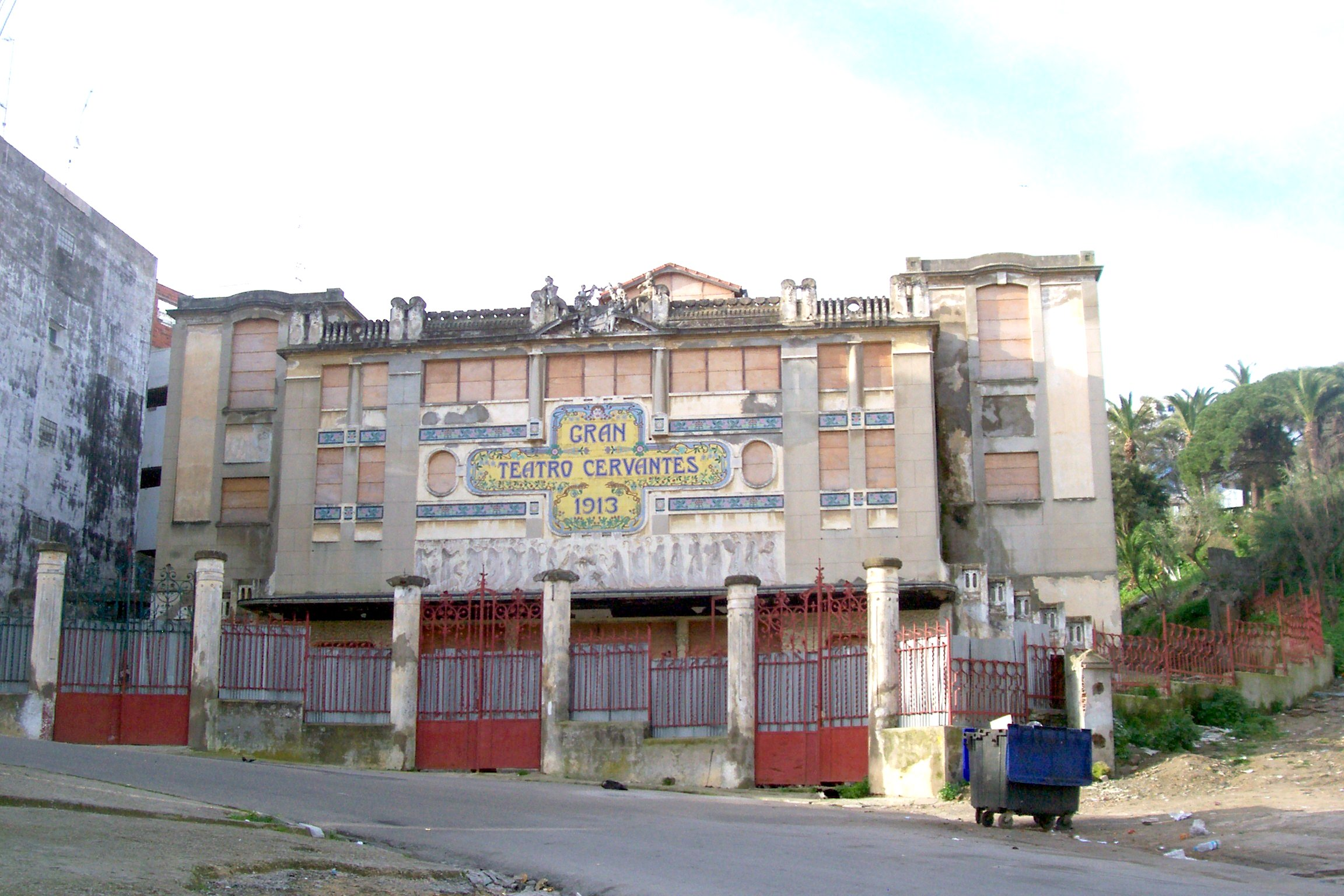
Gran Teatro Cervantes

The construction was led by Esperanza Orellana, her husband Manuel Peña and the owner Antonio Gallego. The first stone was laid on April 2, 1911, in a solemn ceremony, and was completed in 1913, the year of its inauguration. Its capacity is 1400 seats.
