= Petit Socco =

Public square in Tangier, Morocco

Coordinates: 35.7854°N 5.8106°W

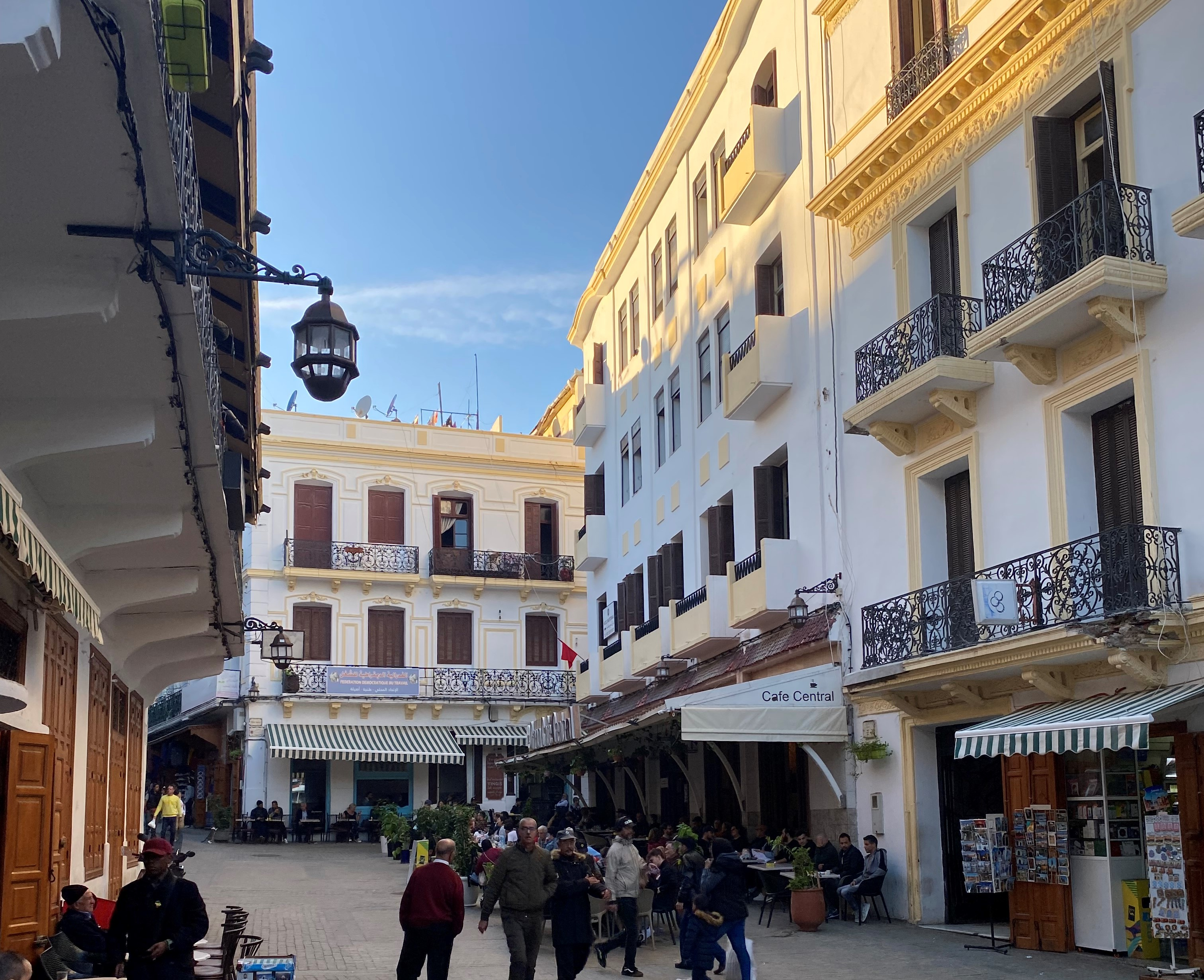
The Gran Café Central (center) on the Petit Socco

The Petit Socco (Arabic: سوق الدخيل), also known as the Place Souk Dakhel, or in Spanish as Zoco Chico, is a small square in the medina quarter of Tangier, Morocco.

== Name ==
The words are a combination of the French word petit, meaning 'little/small', and the Spanish word zoco (often spelled as socco in northern Morocco), meaning souk or marketplace.

== History ==
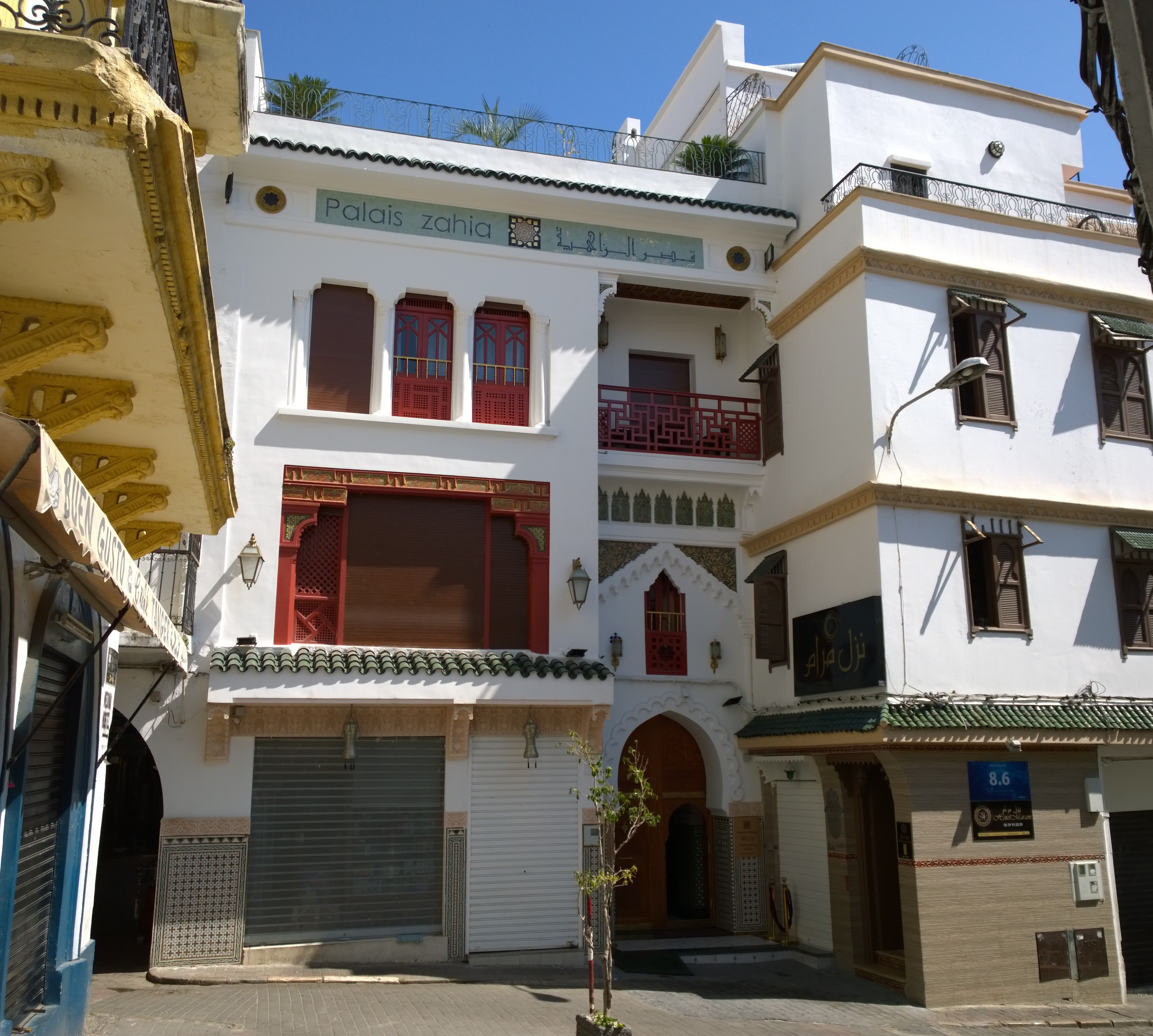
Palais Zahia building next to the Petit Socco, the State Bank of Morocco's head office from 1907 to 1952

The Petit Socco, intersected by rue Es-Siaghine and close to the Grand Mosque, has long been the focal point of the medina or old city of Tangier. Before the inception of the Tangier International Zone in 1923, many of the European nations' consulates in Tangier were in its immediate vicinity, as were the main banks. The head office of the State Bank of Morocco was established next to the Petit Socco at its creation in 1907, and stayed there until 1952 when it moved to a new building outside the medina.

The Petit Socco was the hub of information in diplomatic-era Tanger, with the post offices (also offering telegraphy services) of the four most intrusive nations on each of its sides by the early 20th century: British to the north (between the Café Central and the then Bristolhotel), Spanish to the east, German to the south, and French to the west. The Spanish post office was replaced in 1926 by a new art deco building designed by architect José Blein Zarazaga. Two of that era's iconic establishments, the Hotel Fuentes on its southern side and Gran Café Central on its northern side, still exist as of 2025.

From the 1950s, the Petit Socco declined in prominence and was later known for drugs and prostitution. In recent years, the Petit Socco and surrounding area have undergone significant renovation, as illustrated by the opening in 2017 the Palais Zahia hotel in the former seat of the State Bank, and the inauguration in 2022 of the Dar Niaba Museum on rue Es-Siaghine.

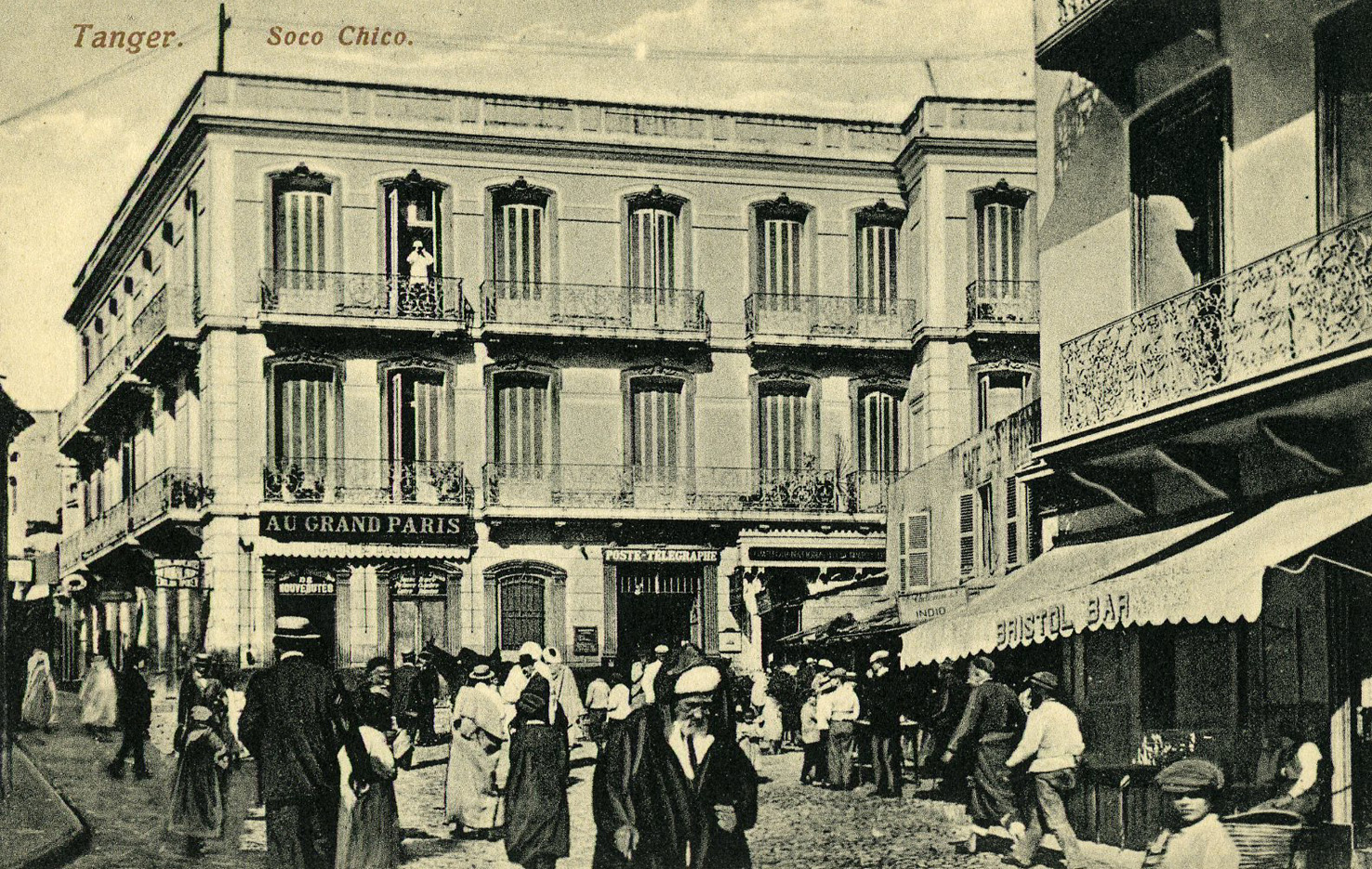
The Petit Socco or Zoco Chico (Spanish name) at the beginning of the twentieth century

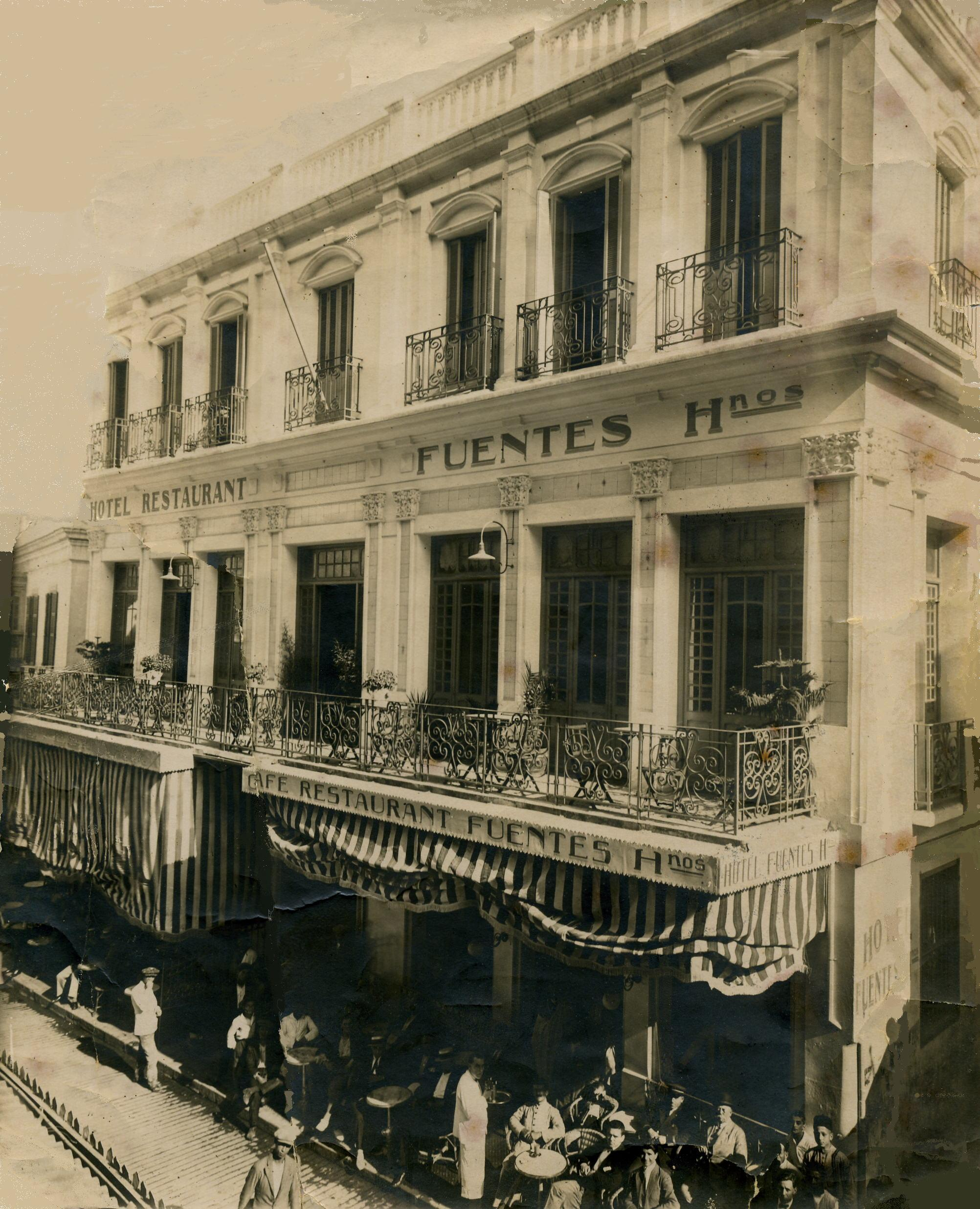
Hotel Fuentes in 1925

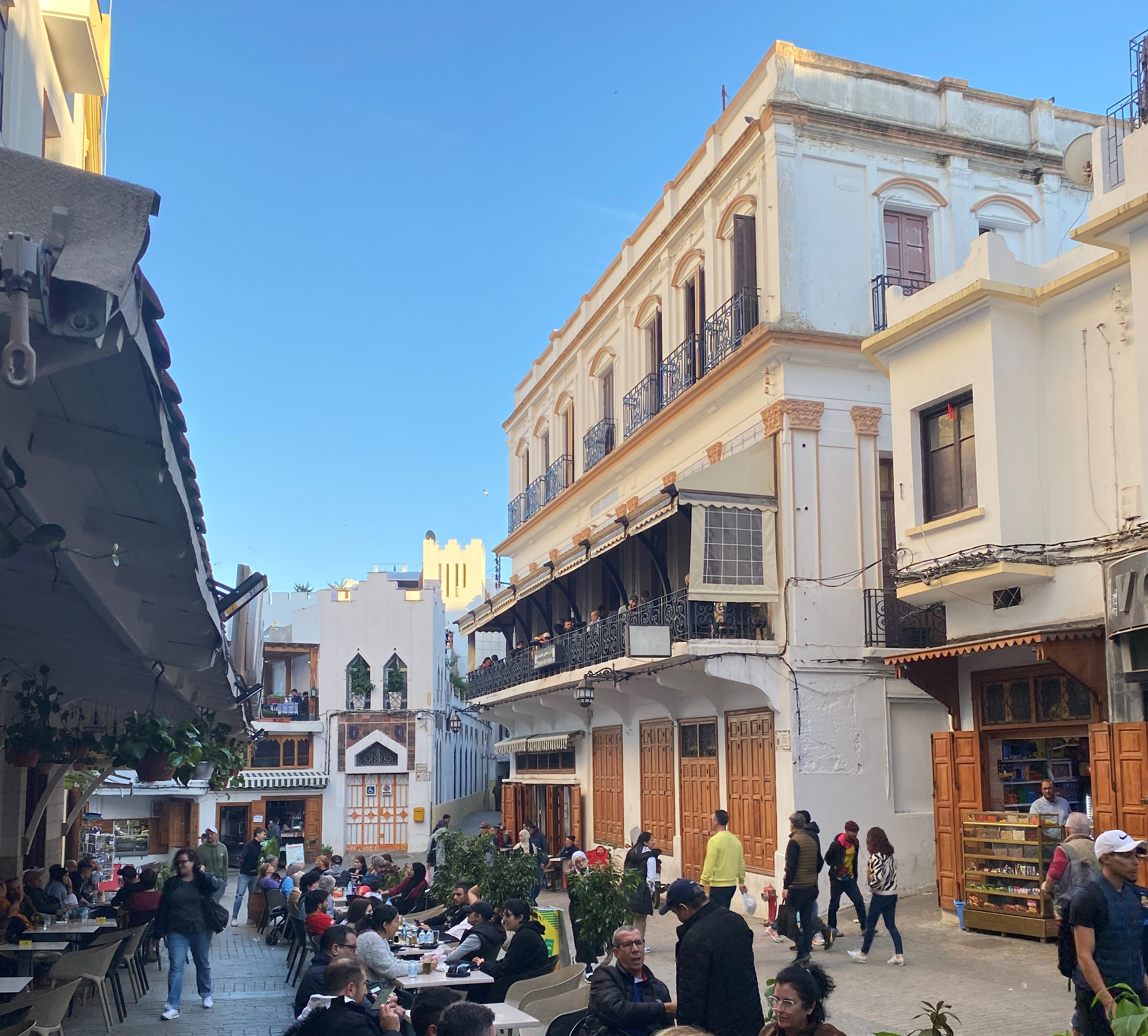
Hotel Fuentes in 2022

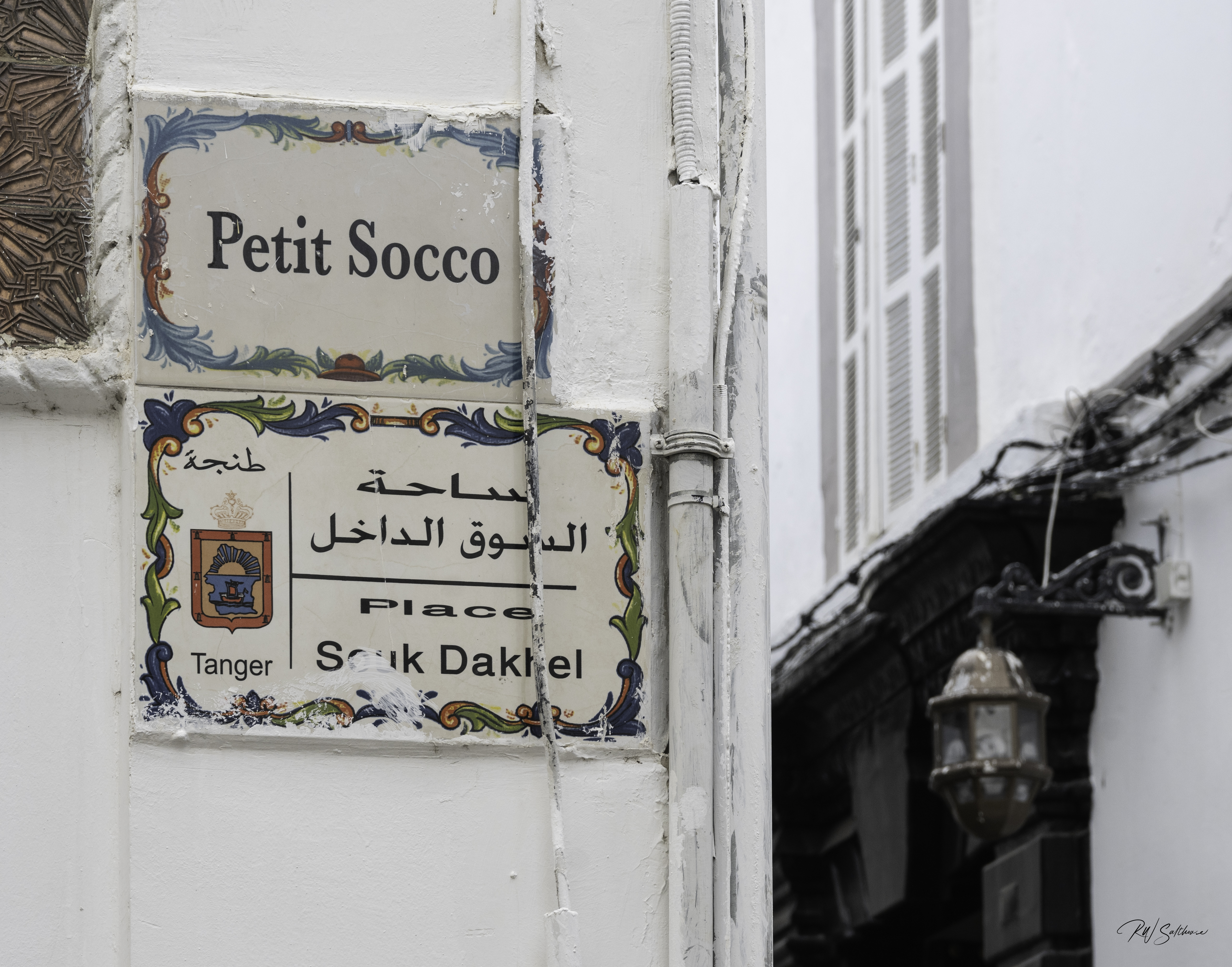
Street name signs

== See also ==
- Grand Socco
