= Dar Niaba =

Historic building in Tangier, Morocco

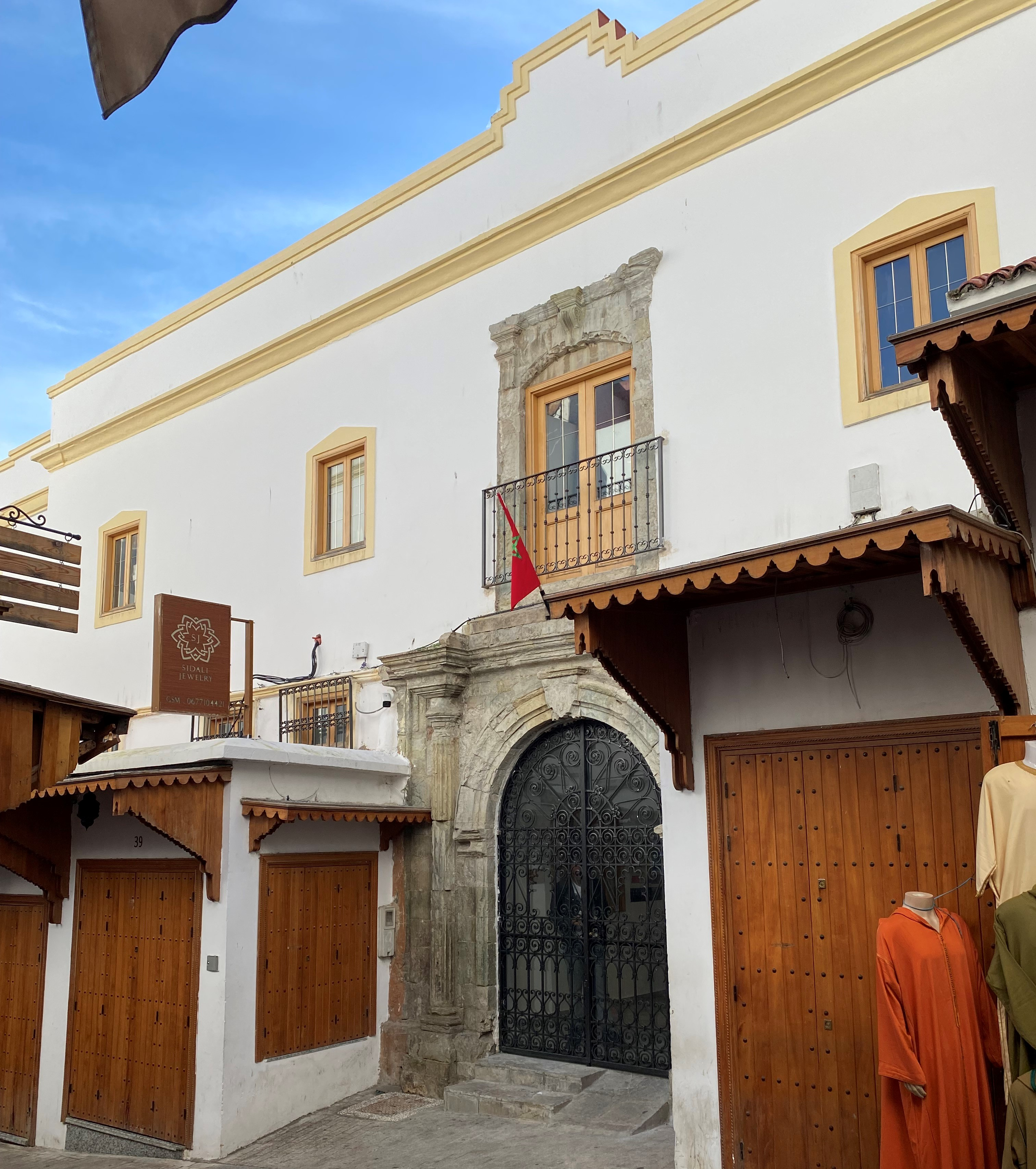
Dar Niaba building in the Medina of Tangier, 2022

Dar Niaba (lit. 'home of the Naib') refers both literally and metaphorically to the office of the Naib (Arabic: نائب "deputy", plural Nawab) or representative of the Sultan of Morocco to the foreign communities in Tangier, under the Moroccan diplomatic arrangements in place from the 1840s to the Treaty of Fez that ended the country's sovereignty in 1912. The office of the Naib was maintained in a symbolic capacity until the creation in 1925 of the Tangier International Zone, when its last holder Mohammed Tazi became Tangier's Mendoub.

Dar Niaba also refers to a Portuguese-era urban mansion on the central rue Es-Siaghine in the medina of Tangier, one of the city's oldest buildings still standing. The office of the Naib was located there from 1851 until 1920, when it moved to the former German legation building later known as the Mendoubia. After a long period of neglect, it was repurposed as the Dar Niaba Museum, opened in 2022.

== Office of the Naib ==
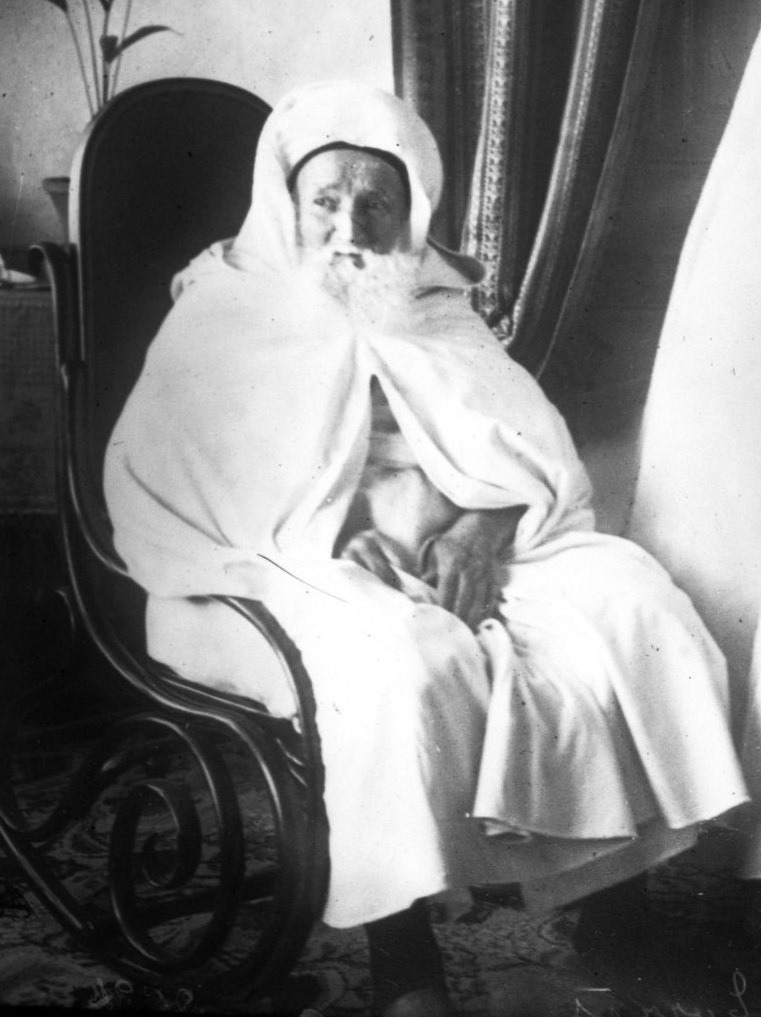
Naib Mohammed Torres in 1906

The office of Dar Niaba was created in the mid-1840s by Sultan Abd al-Rahman of Morocco, as a way to improve the flow of information between the Makhzen and the European powers, following Morocco's defeat by France at the Battle of Isly in 1844. Initially, the office was combined with territorial authority. Its early holder Bouselham Aztut was simultaneously governor of Larache. Under his successor Mohammed al-Khatib, the office of Dar Niaba moved to Tangier in 1851, and became a full-time position in 1854. The Naib did not exercise territorial authority over Tangier and its surroundings, which was the preserve of the Governor of Pasha of Tangier, a separate position whose holder resided in the Kasbah Palace uphill from Dar Niaba.

The successive Naibs were:

- Abdelkader Ash'ash (1846-1848)
- Bouselham ben Ali Aztut (1848-1851)
- Hajj Mohammed al-Khatib (1851-1860)
- Mohammed Bargash (1860-1886)
- Mohammed Torres (1886-1908)
- Mohammed al-Guebbas (1908-1913)
- Hajj Mohammed ben Abdelkrim Tazi Bu Ashran (1913-1925), later the Mendoub in Tangier until 1954

== Dar Niaba building and museum ==
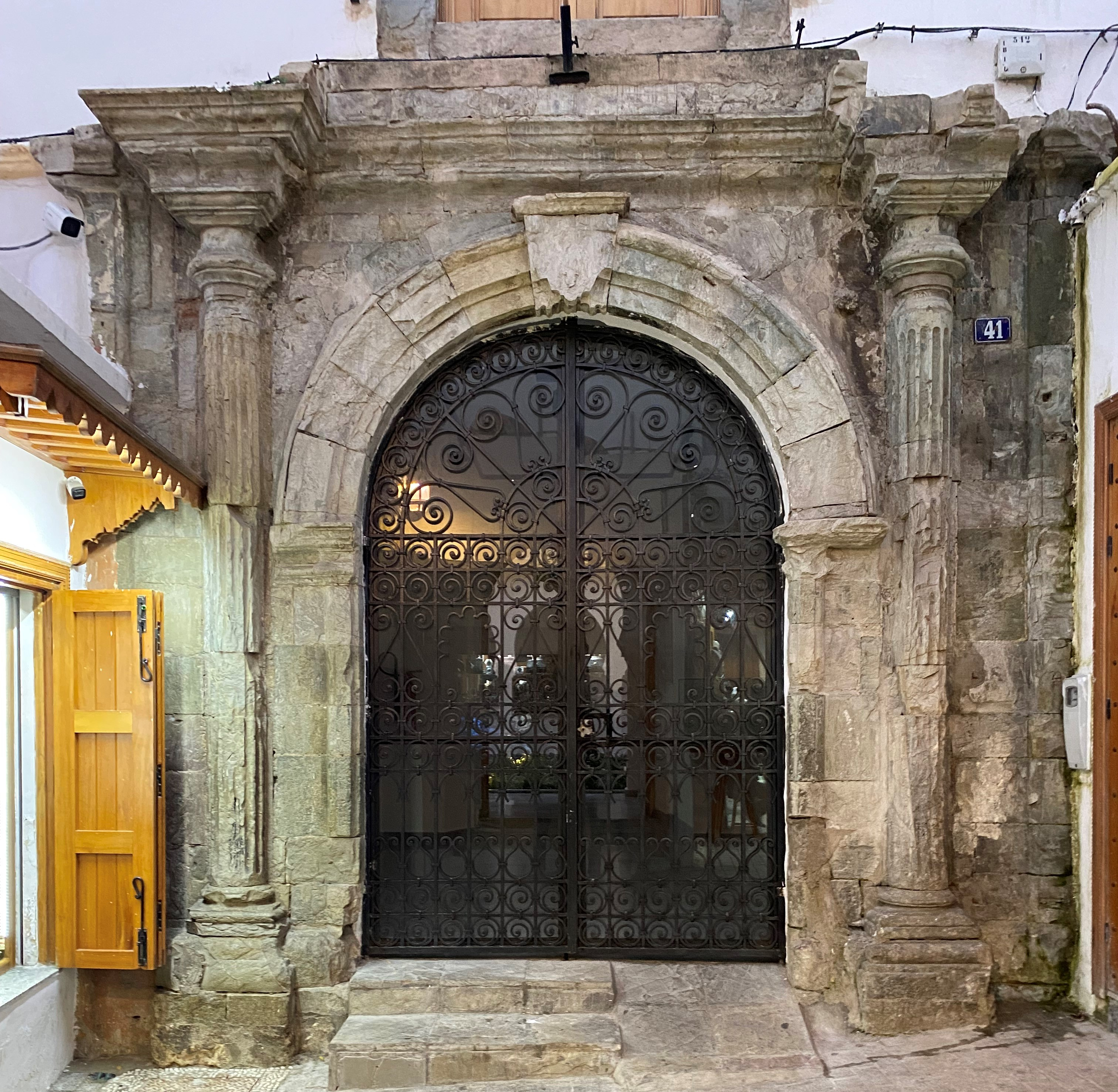
Portal of Dar Niaba dating from the Portuguese rule in Tangier (16th-17th centuries)

The building now known as Dar Niaba was first erected during the era of Portuguese Tangier, and its monumental stone portal is preserved from that period. From 1816 to 1849, it was the location of the French Consulate General, which was elevated to a legation in 1846. The French government had purchased it in 1845 but sold it a few years later for use by the Naib.

In 1920, in application of the Treaty of Versailles, the former German legation building, outside the medina, was repurposed for use by the Naib. The old Dar Niaba building was subsequently used by various bureaucracies and fell into disrepair. It was eventually renovated in the early 2020s on a design by the architect Mounir Anouar.

The Dar Niaba Museum was installed in the renovated building and inaugurated on 20 September 2022. It displays exhibits on the diplomatic history of Tangier and a small art collection.

== See also ==
- Mendoub's Residence
- Zongli Yamen
