= Great Mosque of Asilah =

Main mosque of the historic royal citadel in the old city of Tangier, Morocco

Grand Mosque of Asilah
- المسجد الجامع
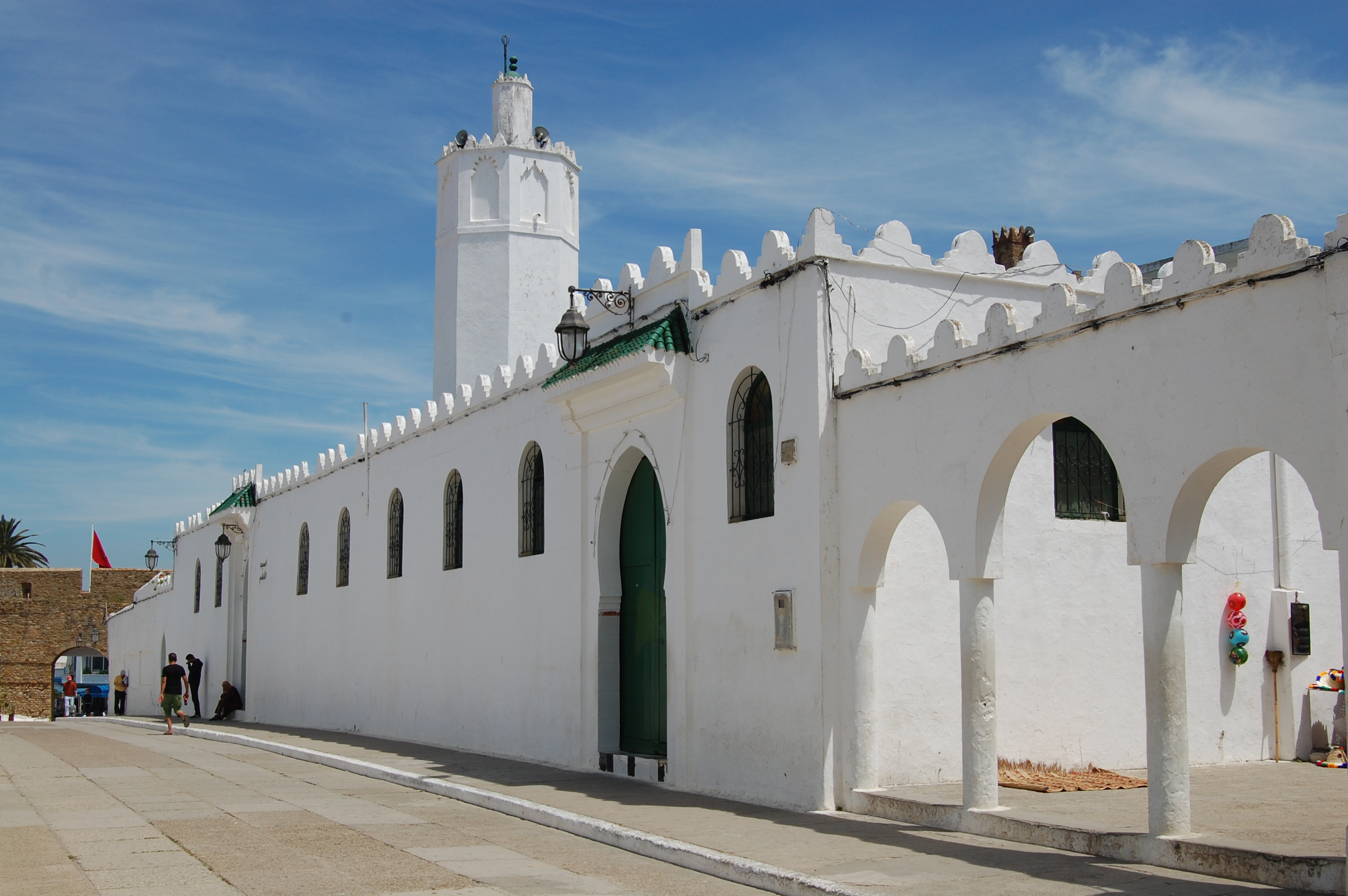

- Location within Morocco Location within Mediterranean

Religion
- Affiliation: Islam
- Status: active

Location
- Location: Asilah
- Country: Morocco
- Coordinates: 35°27′56″N 6°02′11″W

Architecture
- Type: mosque
- Style: Moroccan, Moorish
- Minaret: 1

The Grand Mosque in Asilah, Morocco, is the main mosque of the historic royal citadel (kasbah) in the old city (medina) of Asilah. It was built under Moulay Ismail in the late 17th century.

== History ==
The Grand Mosque of Asilah is located inside the former kasbah (citadel), at the eastern end of the medina. It was built soon after the city was retaken at the end of the 17th century.

Moulay Ismail charged the new governor of Tangier, Ali ibn Abdallah Errifi, with building the mosque; however, it is possible that it was his son, Ahmed Errifi, who actually carried out the construction.

It has an octagonal minaret, a feature common to some parts of northern Morocco but not in the rest of the country. With its whitewashed walls and minaret, its decoration is quite plain compared to other mosques built by the Errifis at the same time (such as the Kasbah Mosque in Tangier). Like other Moroccan mosques, it is open to Muslims only.

== Gallery ==
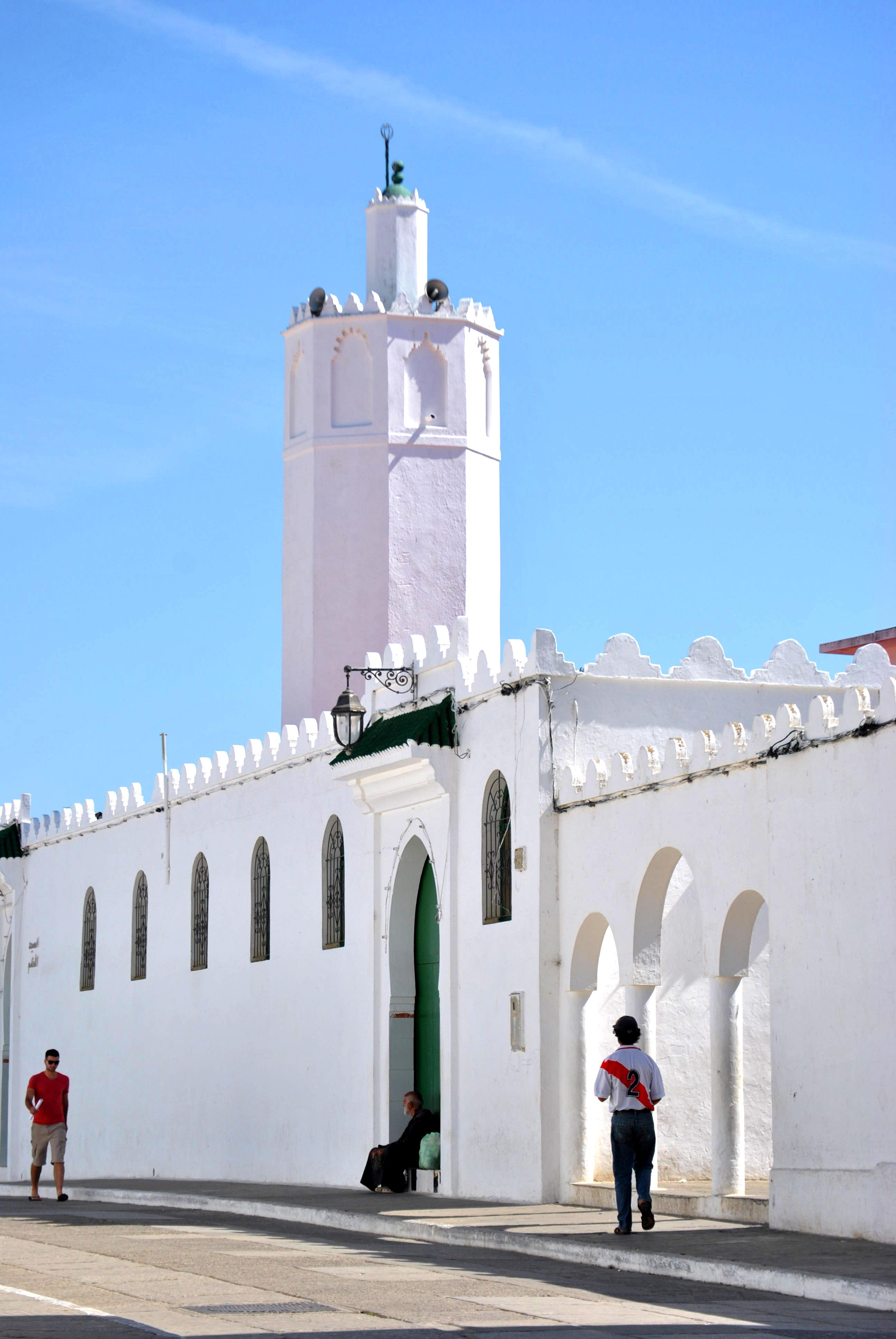

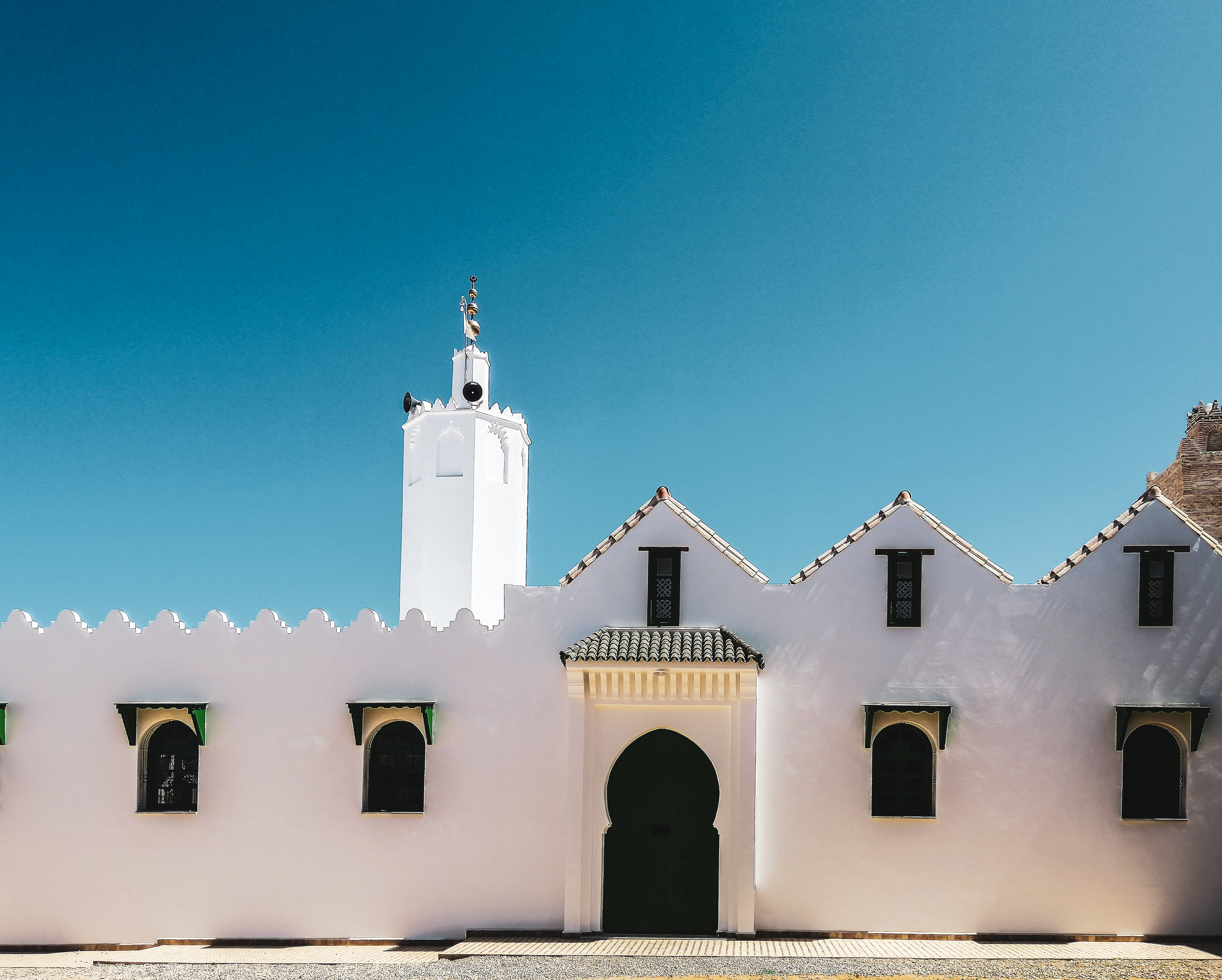

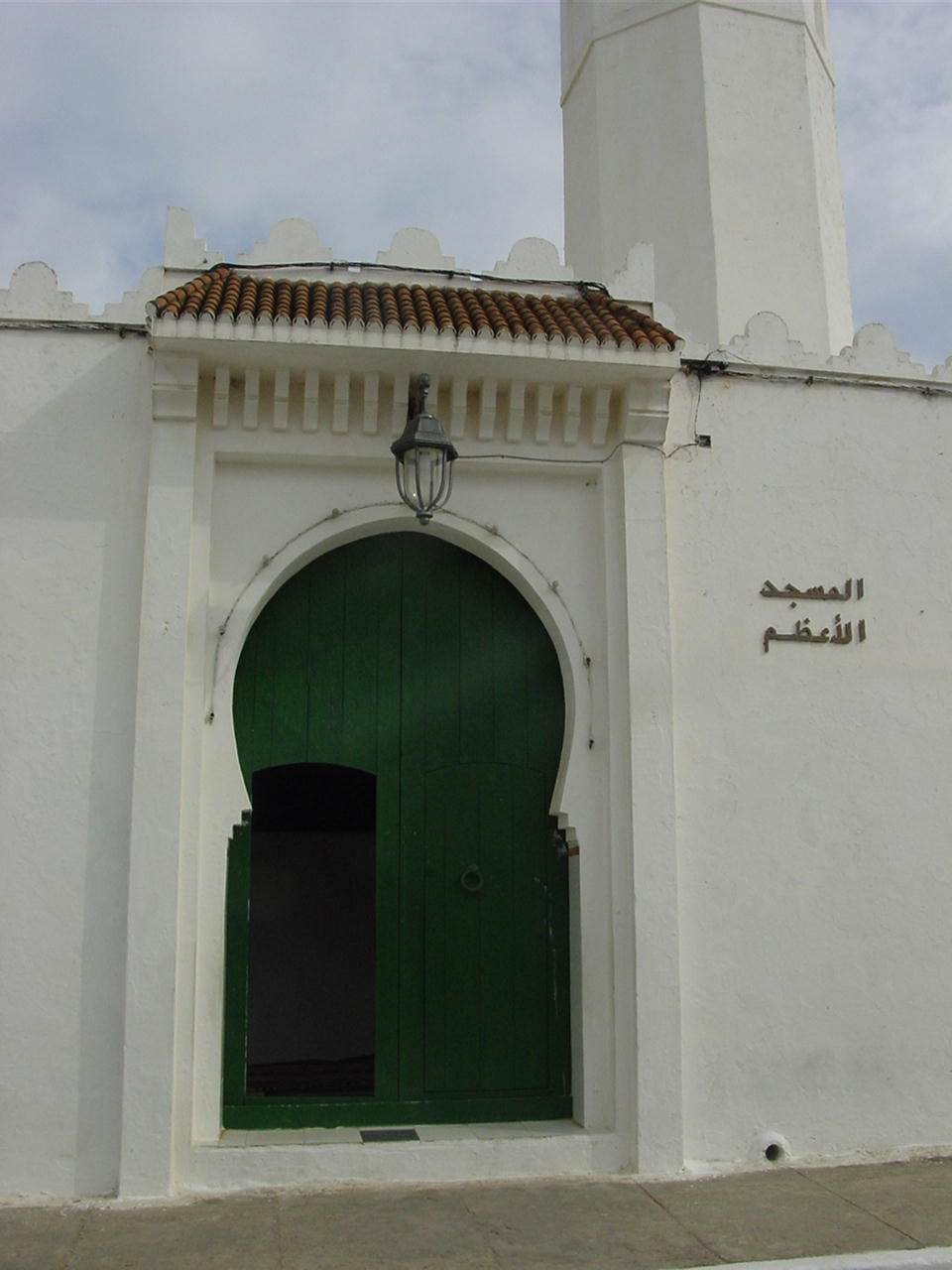

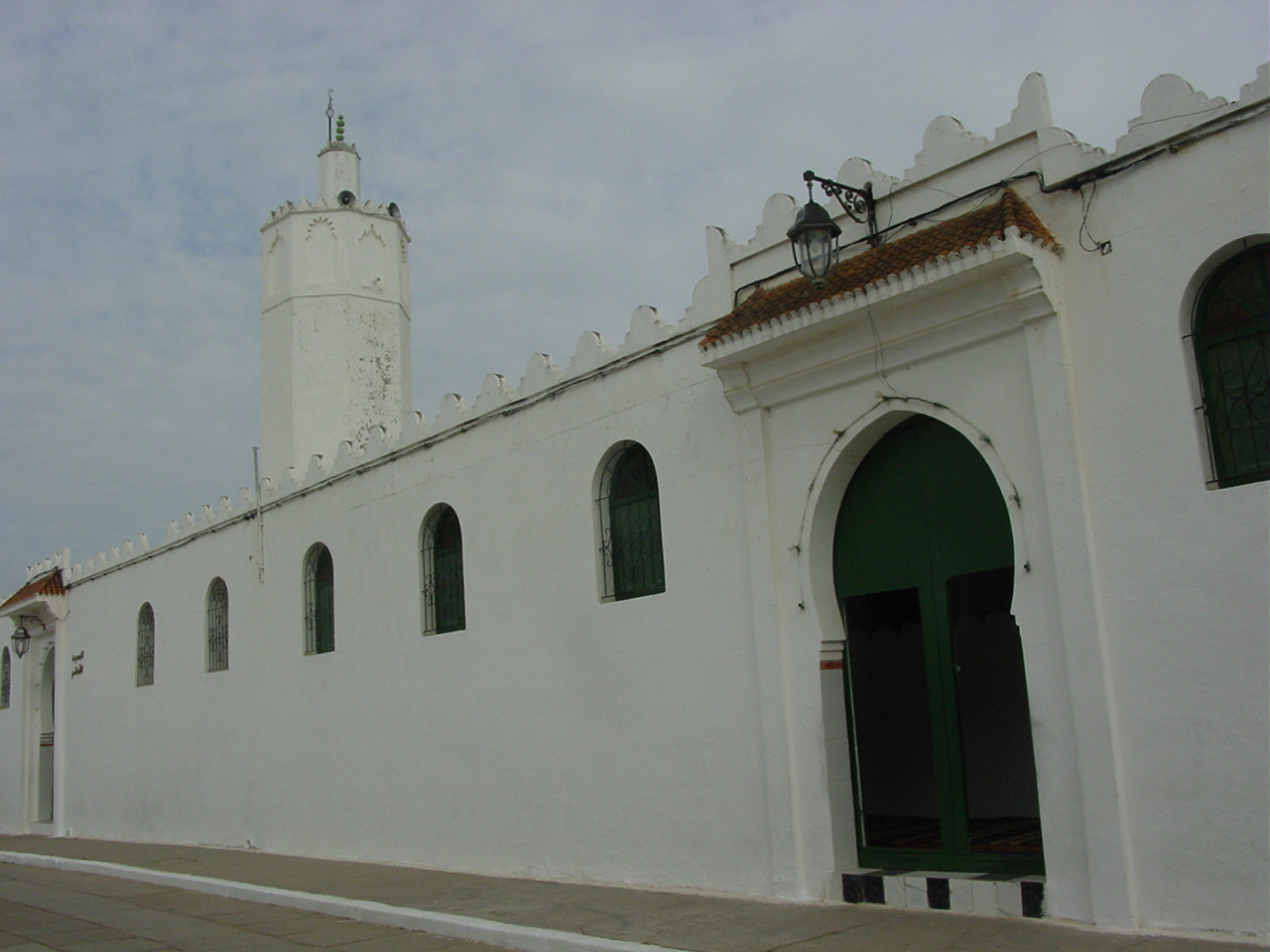

== See also ==
- Asilah
- Kasbah Mosque
- List of mosques in Morocco
