= Kasbah Mosque =

Kasbah Mosque may refer to:

- Kasbah Mosque, Marrakesh
- Kasbah Mosque, Tunis
- Kasbah Mosque, Tangier
