= Grand Mosque of Tangier =

Mosque in Tangier, Morocco

- مسجد طنجة الأعظم
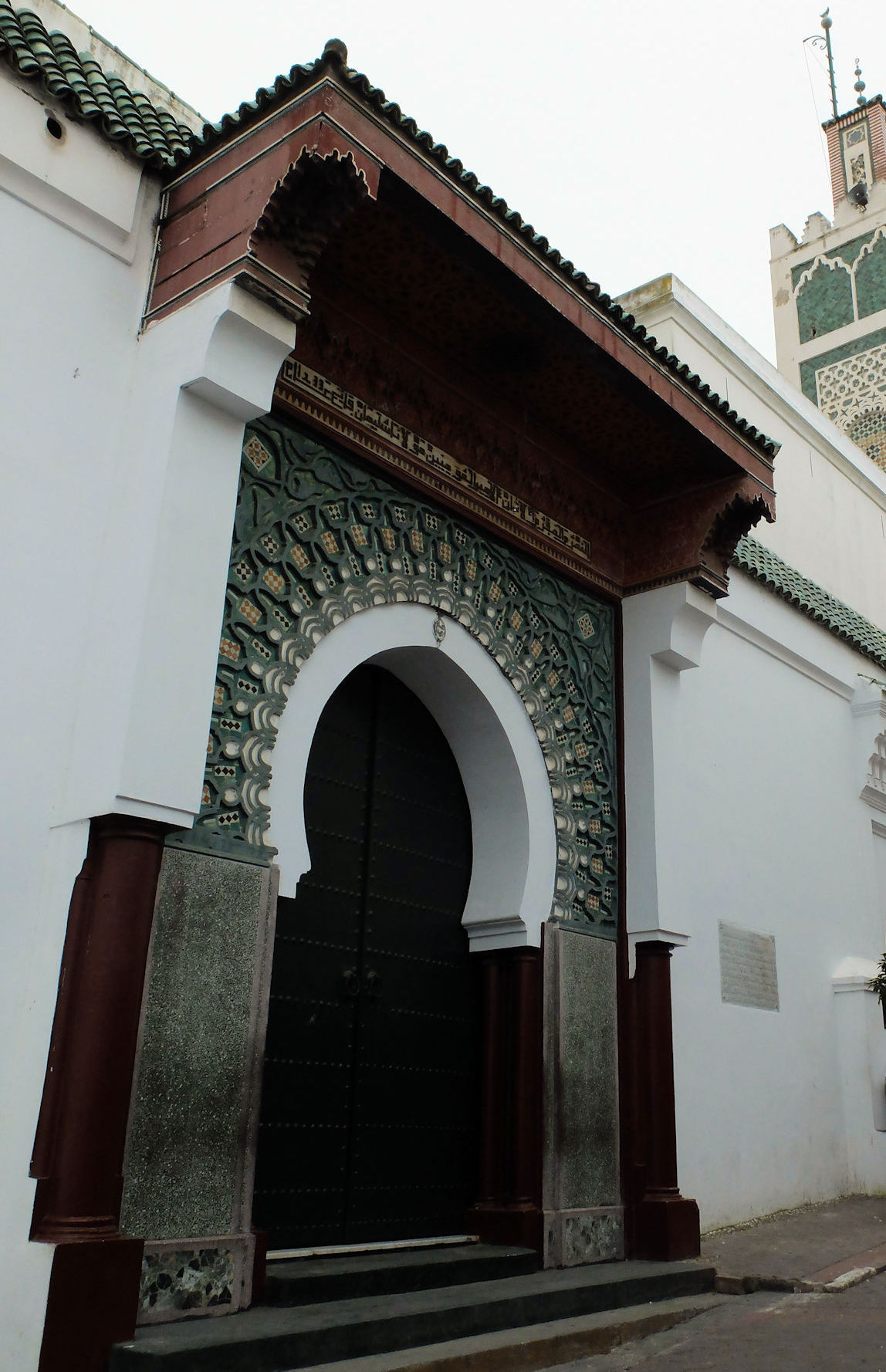
- View of the mosque's main façade from Rue de la Marine

Religion
- Affiliation: Islam
- Patron: Moulay Slimane (and other members of the Alaouite dynasty)
- Status: active

Location
- Location: Tangier, Morocco
- Interactive map of Grand Mosque of Tangier
- Coordinates: 35°47′08″N 5°48′34″W

Architecture
- Type: mosque
- Style: Alaouite, Moroccan, Moorish
- Founder: Ali ibn Abdallah Errifi
- Established: 1684 (on the site of previous religious buildings)
- Completed: 1817-18 (current structure)

Specifications
- Minaret: 1
- Materials: brick, stucco, wood

The Grand Mosque of Tangier (Arabic: مسجد طنجة الكبير) is the historic main mosque (Friday mosque) of Tangier, Morocco, located in the city's old medina. While the design of the current mosque dates from the early 19th century during the Alaouite period, the site has been occupied by a succession of religious buildings since antiquity.

== History ==
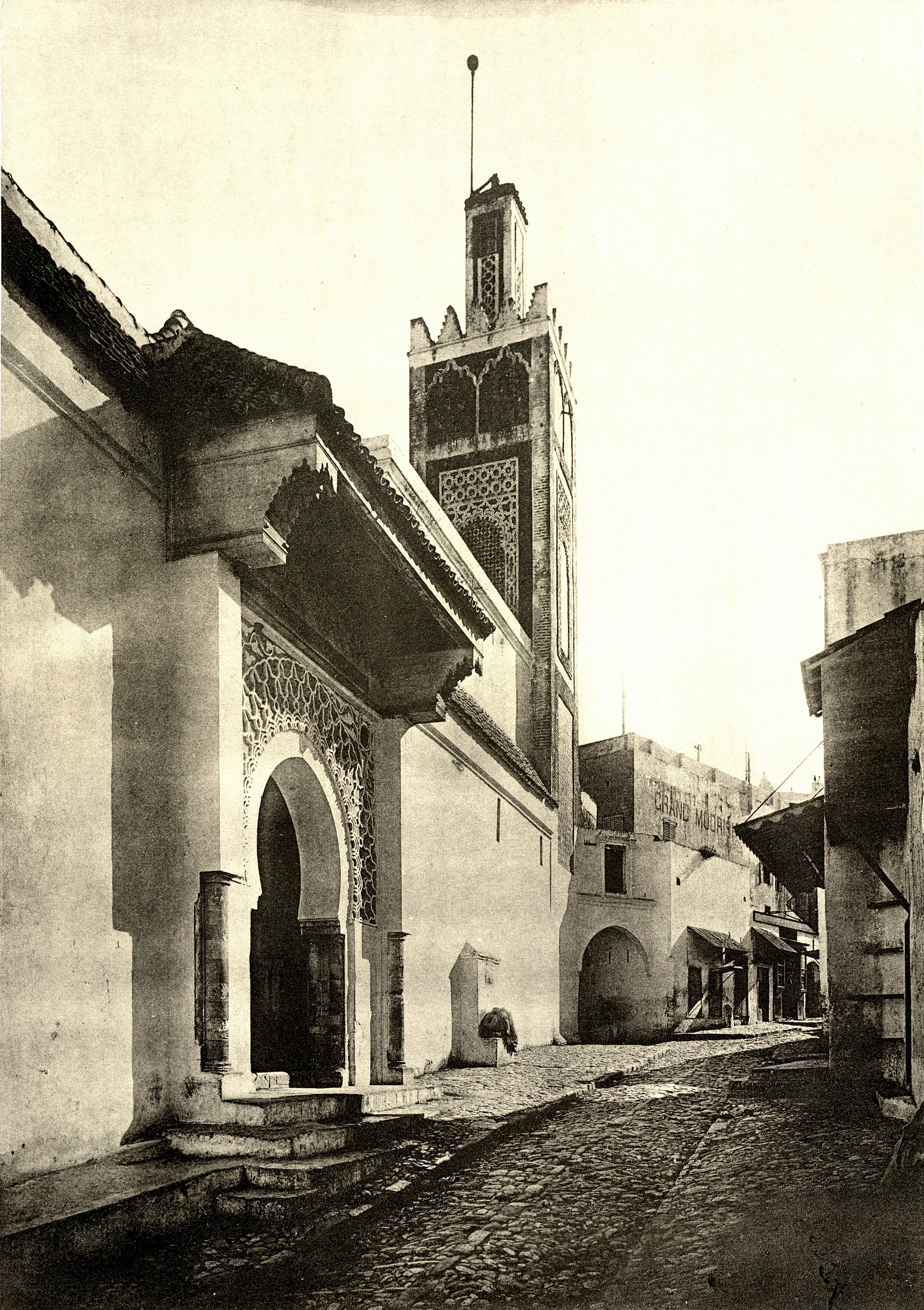
The Grand Mosque of Tangier in 1892

The site of the mosque is believed to have originally been the site of a Roman temple dedicated to Hercules and of a 5th-century Roman church. A grand mosque (Friday mosque) was established on this site during the Marinid dynasty (13th-15th centuries). Tangier was frequently besieged by European forces in the 15th century until it was finally conquered by the Portuguese in 1471. The Portuguese immediately converted the mosque or rebuilt the site into a cathedral. In 1662 Tangier was passed to the English as part of Catherine of Braganza's dowry to Charles II. After years under pressure from local Muslim mujahidin attacks, the English evacuated Tangier in 1684, blowing up its fortifications before leaving. The sultan of Morocco at the time, Moulay Ismail from the Alaouite dynasty, immediately claimed the city and supported its Muslim resettlement (including by many of the mujahidin who had fought against the European presence). The Muslim settlers immediately sought to pray in the cathedral which had formerly been the grand mosque. Moulay Ismail ordered the new governor, Ali ibn Abdallah Errifi, to convert the building to a mosque.

The new mosque, however, was reportedly very crude, despite being an important symbol of the city's return to Muslim rule. Muslim travelers commented on its poor amenities. The Alaouite Sultan Moulay Slimane was reportedly so shocked by its condition upon seeing it in 1815 that he immediately ordered that it be completely rebuilt. Artisans from outside Tangier were recruited to help with the task, and the reconstruction was completed in 1817–18. The mosque's current form dates essentially from this construction. Subsequent Alaouite sultans continued to embellish or restore the mosque, reinforcing its role as a symbol of the government's importance in upholding religious orthodoxy in the face of other popular forms of religion focused around Sufi marabouts. Along with the khutba, the weekly Friday sermon, important official announcements were also delivered here.

The mosque was also a focus of civic life and urban infrastructure. It was located near the Inner Market (formerly the Roman Forum), following a pattern found in other Moroccan and Islamic cities where the most important or prestigious commercial activities took place near the city's main mosque. Across the street on the southwest side of the mosque was the house of the qadi, or judge, where legal cases were heard and resolved. Next to this was the house of the muwaqqit, the timekeeper of the mosque (i.e. responsible for accurately determining the time of prayers), which was connected to the mosque itself by an overhead passage between the house and the minaret. Further south on the same street was a cistern, a maristan or hospital dedicated to caring for the mentally ill, and a house for washing the bodies of the dead (especially for foreigners who died far from home, given Tangier's role as a port). On the mosque's northwestern side, across the street from its main entrance, was a madrasa (school) built in the 18th century under sultan Muhammad ben 'Abdallah. Attached directly to the mosque itself, behind its southeastern wall (the qibla wall), was a library and a funeral mosque (jama' al-gna'iz, where funerary rites were performed before the body's burial). Some of these amenities were managed and funded by the habous (or waqf) of the mosque; that is, a charitable trust under which the mosque drew revenues from various sources for its upkeep and the upkeep of its associated establishments.

In the decades prior to colonial rule and the establishment of an international regime governing Tangier (between 1924 and 1956), the mosque's civic importance declined and the fiscal assets of its habous were increasingly confiscated or diverted by the government. Under colonial rule all habous establishments were further curtailed and lost their role as agents of urban development. Like in many other North African cities, a Ville Nouvelle ("New City") was established outside the old city walls and rapidly outgrew it, thus reducing the status of the old medina (walled city) to a relatively undesirable and decaying neighbourhood, along with its main mosque.

Mohammed V visited the mosque on April 11, 1947, going on to make a historic speech at the Mendoubia Gardens. Hassan II ordered an extension to the mosque in 1962, expanding it on its southwest side. The mosque was restored again in 2001 by order of Mohammed VI.

== Architecture ==
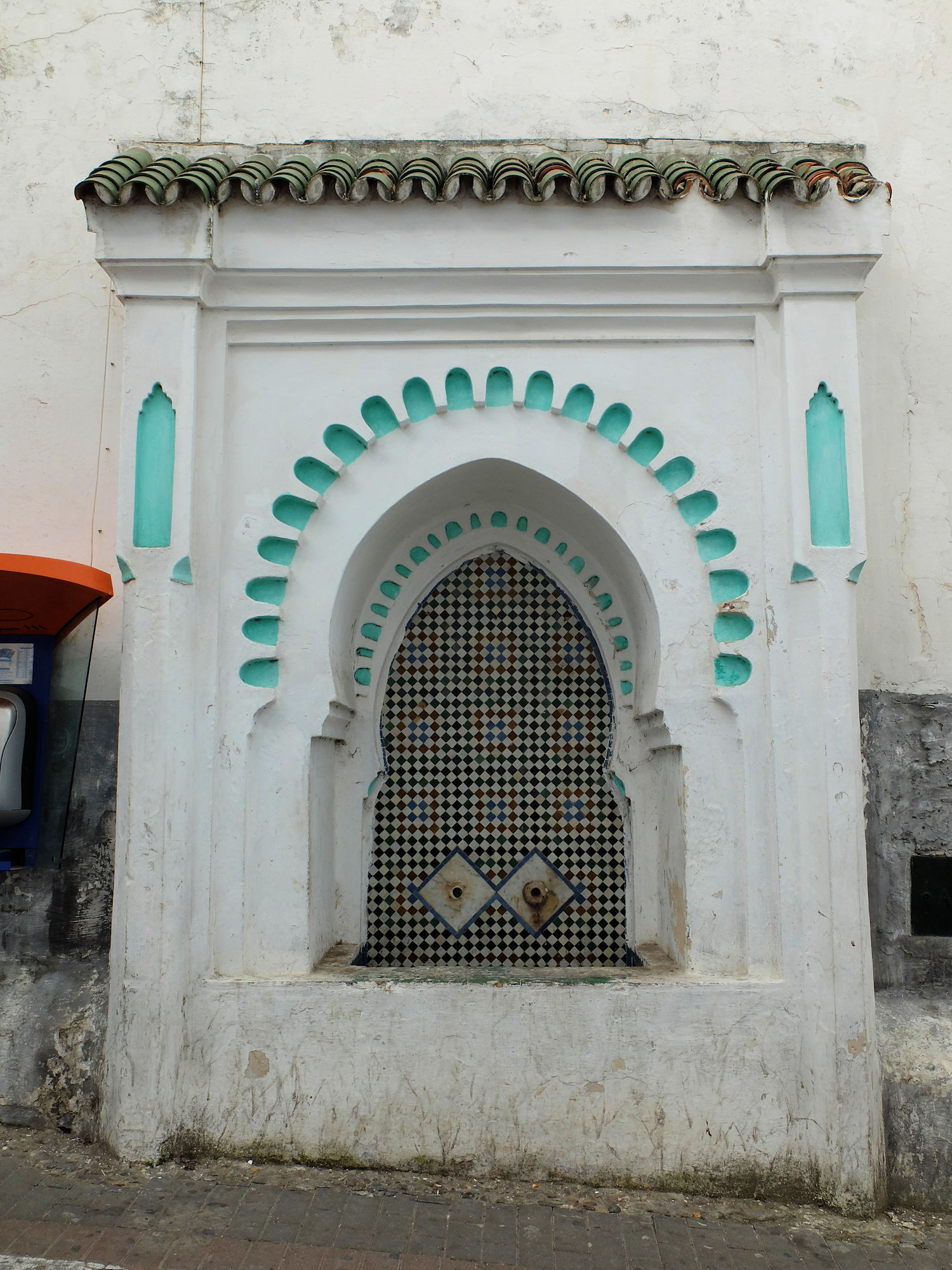
The late 19th-century street fountain across from the mosque's main entrance (photo from 2014)

The mosque is located on Rue de la Marine, just below the Petit Socco and above the sea walls of the medina. Opposite the mosque is a primary school, established by nationalists during the French protectorate. Many of the old annexes to the mosque are now gone or no longer serve their original purpose. The mosque itself is still in use, and as such it is closed to non-Muslims (like most mosques in Morocco). Across the street from the mosque is also a public fountain decorated with tile mosaic inside a horseshoe arch with carved stucco outlines. The fountain dates from the late 19th century and was restored in 1918 and 2003.

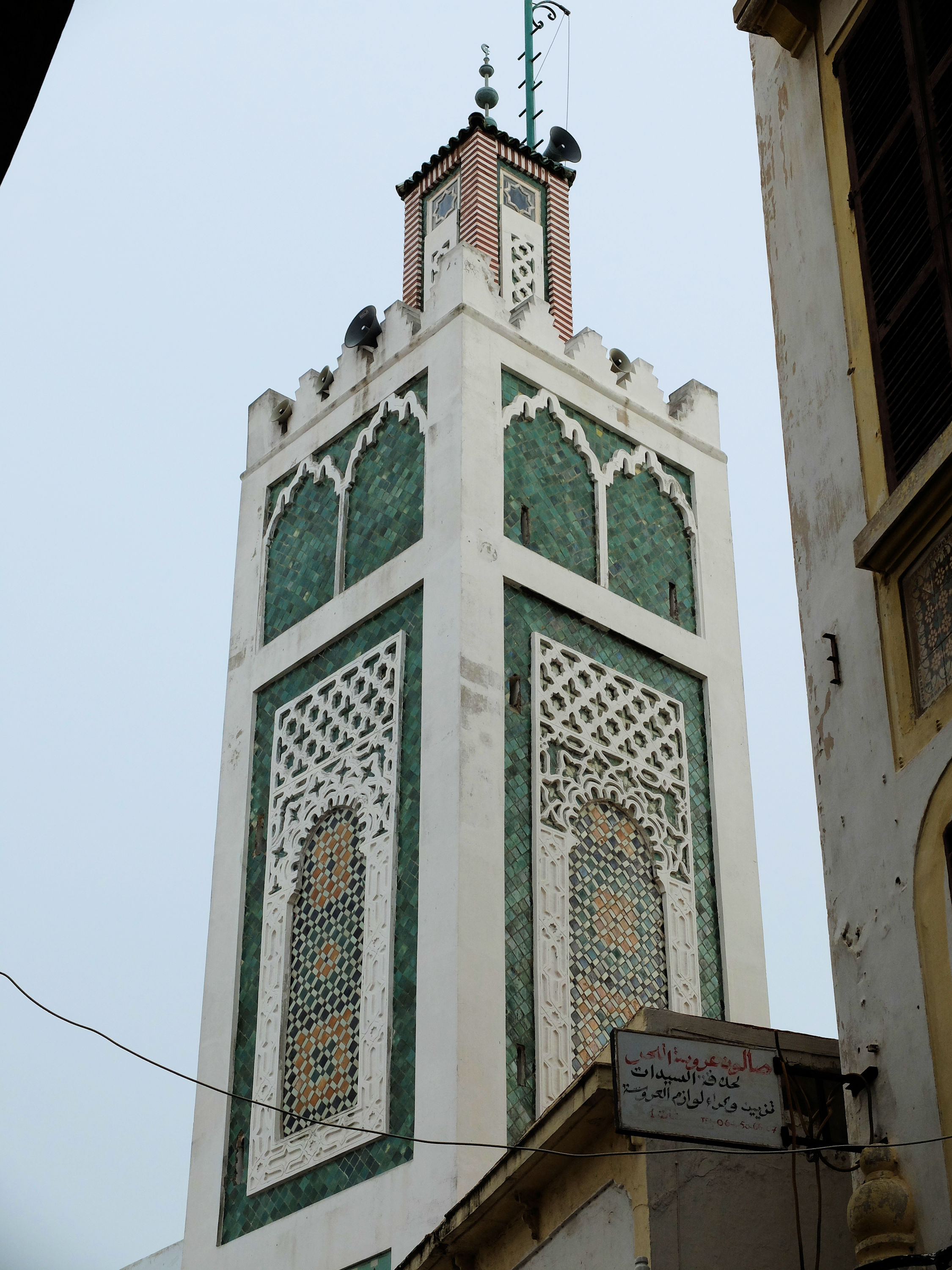
The minaret

The mosque is distinguished on the outside by its minaret and its entrance portal. The entrance portal is decorated with typical radiating geometric motifs, green colours, and a wooden canopy, mostly still dating from the time of Moulay Slimane. The minaret, at the mosque's western corner, is typical of Alaouite-era minarets, inheriting the traditional form of Moroccan minaret architecture. It has a large square shaft crowned by merlons and topped by a smaller, secondary shaft at its summit. Its facades are decorated with more geometric motifs and blind arches outlined in white stucco. In the negative space between the stucco outlines the surfaces are covered with green tiles or multicoloured tile mosaics.

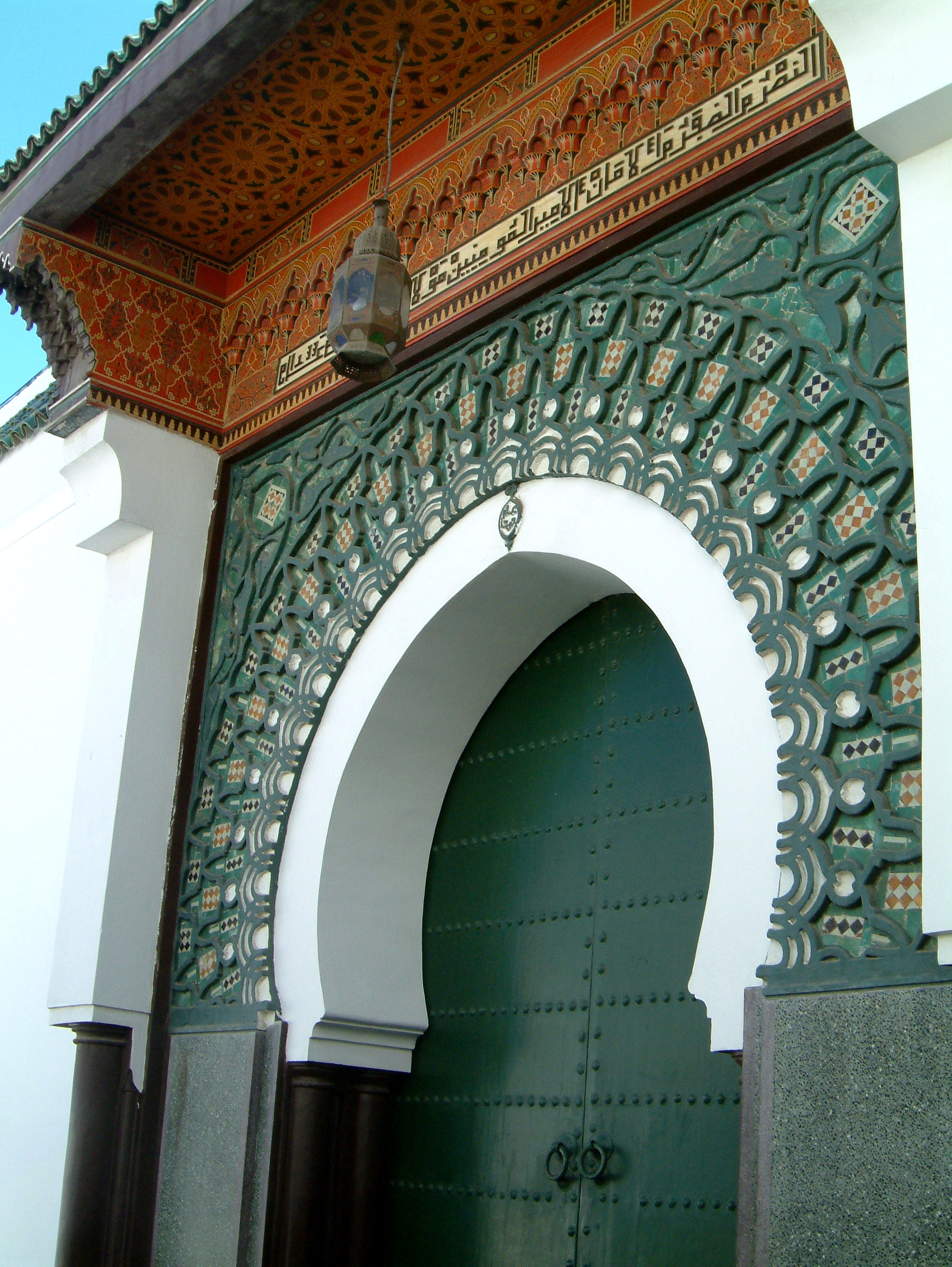
The mosque's main portal

The interior of the mosque features a square courtyard with a central fountain, around which are indoor galleries and the main prayer hall. The galleries and prayer hall, like those of most Moroccan mosques, are interior hypostyle spaces marked by rows of arches. The galleries to the southwest and northeast of the courtyard are two aisles deep, while the gallery to the northwest (on the side of the main entrance) is only one row deep. The main prayer hall, which extends from the courtyard towards the qibla (direction of prayer) and the mihrab (niche symbolizing the direction of prayer), is three aisles deep. Behind the mihrab wall at the far end are a few rooms that were historically used, or are still used, as a library, imam's chamber, and funeral mosque (for conducting funerary rites before the burial of a body), all accessed from within the mosque. A newer extension to the mosque, likely from 1962, appears to extend from this main historic building towards the southwest.

== See also ==
- Kasbah Mosque, Tangier
- Sidi Bou Abid Mosque
- Mohammed V Mosque, Tangier
- Lalla Abla Mosque
- List of mosques in Morocco
