= Minaret =

Architectural feature of mosques

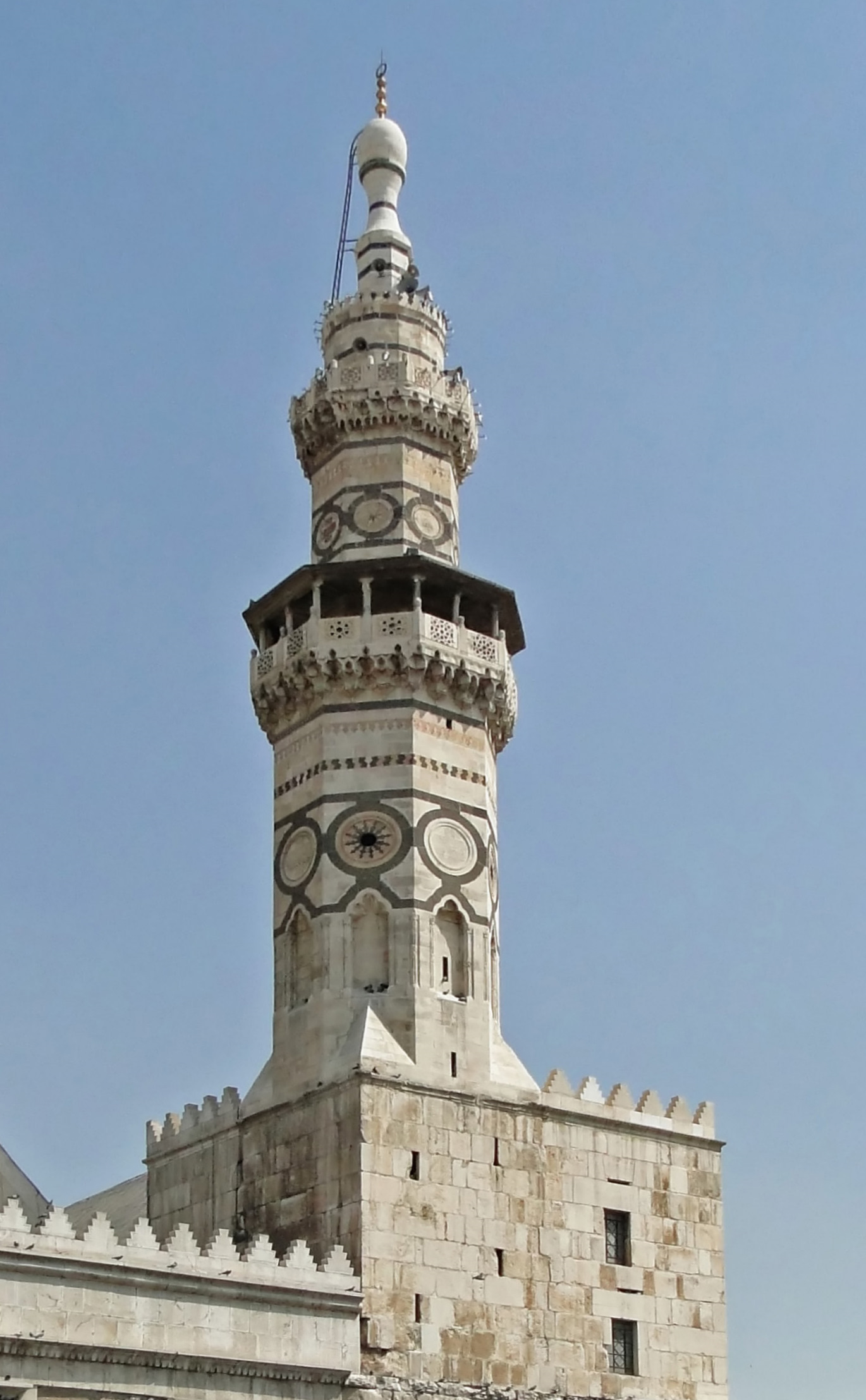
Minaret at the Umayyad Mosque in Damascus

A minaret (Note: /ˌmɪnəˈrɛt, ˈmɪnəˌrɛt/; Arabic: منارة, romanized: manāra, or Arabic: مِئْذَنة, romanized: miʾḏana; Turkish: minare; Persian: گل‌دسته, romanized: goldaste) is a type of tower typically built into or adjacent to mosques. Minarets are generally used to project the Muslim call to prayer (adhan) from a muezzin, but they also served as landmarks and symbols of Islam's presence. They can have a variety of forms, from thick, squat towers to soaring, pencil-thin spires.

== Etymology ==
Two Arabic words are used to denote the minaret tower: منارة manāra and منار manār. The English word "minaret" originates from the former, via the Turkish version (minare). The Arabic word manāra (plural: manārāt) originally meant a "lamp stand", a cognate of Hebrew menorah. It is assumed to be a derivation of an older reconstructed form, manwara. The other word, manār (plural: manā'ir or manāyir), means "a place of light". Both words derive from the Arabic root n-w-r, which has a meaning related to "light". Both words also had other meanings attested during the early Islamic period: manār could also mean a "sign" or "mark" (to show one where to go) and both manār and manāra could mean "lighthouse".

== Functions ==
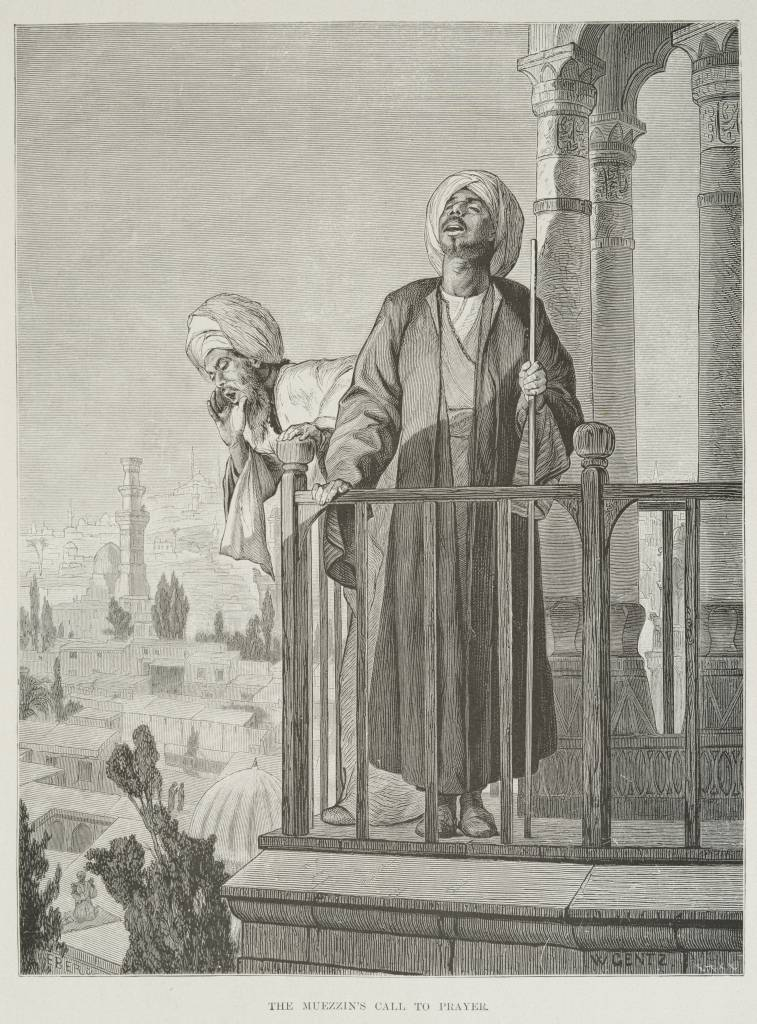
An orientalist depiction of the muezzin's call to prayer from the balcony of a minaret, 1878. Usually only one muezzin chants the azan from the balcony, back straight and not leaning on the railing.

The formal function of a minaret is to provide a vantage point from which the muezzin can issue the call to prayer, or adhan. The call to prayer is issued five times each day: dawn, noon, mid-afternoon, sunset, and night. In most modern mosques, the adhān is called from the musallah (prayer hall) via microphone to a speaker system on the minaret.

Additionally, minarets historically served a visual symbolic purpose. In the early 9th century, the first minarets were placed opposite the qibla wall. (Note: The qibla is the direction of prayer for Muslims, and "qibla wall" of a mosque refers to the wall towards which Muslims face when praying.) Oftentimes, this placement was not beneficial in reaching the community for the call to prayer. They served as a reminder that the region was Islamic and helped to distinguish mosques from the surrounding architecture. They also acted as symbols of the political and religious authority of the Muslim rulers who built them.

== Construction and design ==
The region's socio-cultural context has influenced the shape, size, and form of minarets. Different regions and periods developed different styles of minarets. Typically, the tower's shaft has a cylindrical, cuboid (square), or octagonal shape. Stairs or ramps inside the tower climb to the top in a counterclockwise fashion. Some minarets have two or three narrow staircases fitted inside one another in order to allow multiple individuals to safely descend and ascend simultaneously. At the top of the stairs, a balcony (scherefe) encircles the upper sections of the tower and from here the muezzin may give the call to prayer. Some minaret traditions featured multiple balconies along the tower's shaft. The summit often finishes in a lantern-like structure and/or a small dome, conical roof, or curving stone cap, which is in turn topped by a decorative metal finial. Different architectural traditions also placed minarets at different positions relative to the mosque. The number of minarets by mosques was also not fixed: originally only one minaret accompanied a mosque, but some later traditions constructed more, especially for larger or more prestigious mosques.

Minarets are built out of any material that is readily available, and often changes from region to region. In the construction of the tall and slender Ottoman minarets, molten iron was poured into pre-cut cavities inside the stones, which then solidified and helped to bind the stones together. This made the structures more resistant to earthquakes and powerful winds.

Elements of typical minaret design

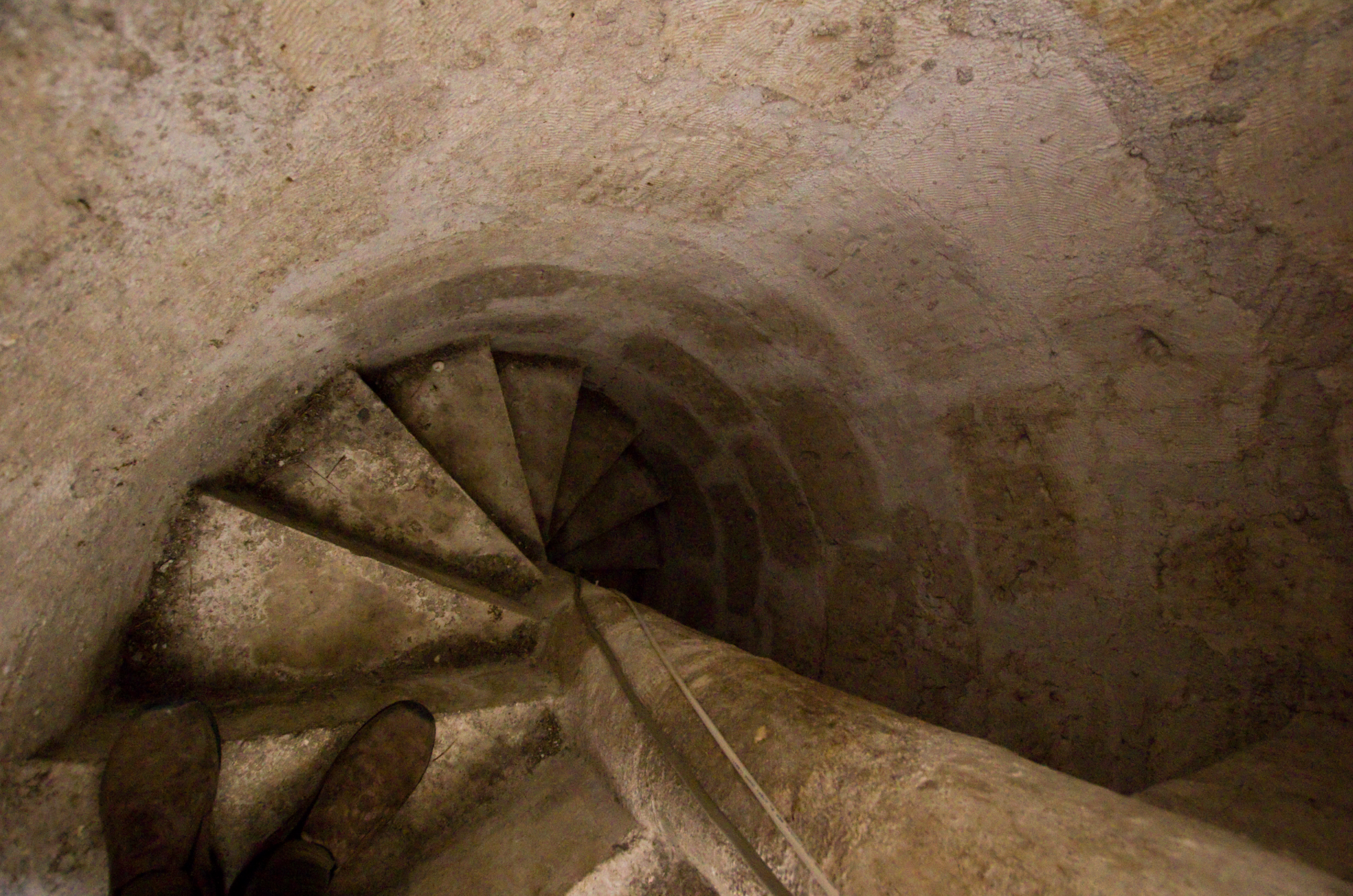
Inside the stairway of a minaret in Mostar

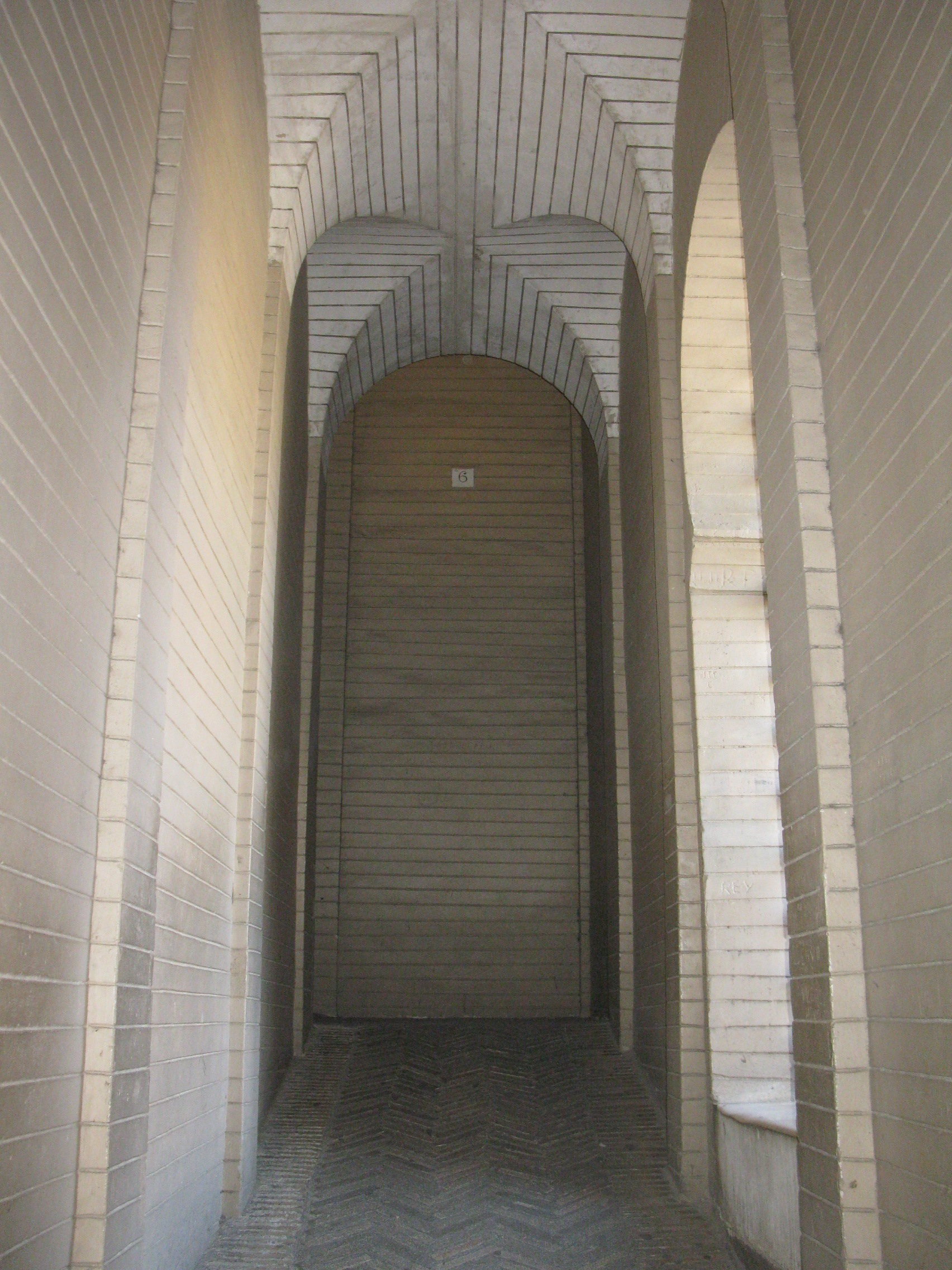
Inside the Giralda minaret in Seville, which has ascending ramps instead of stairs

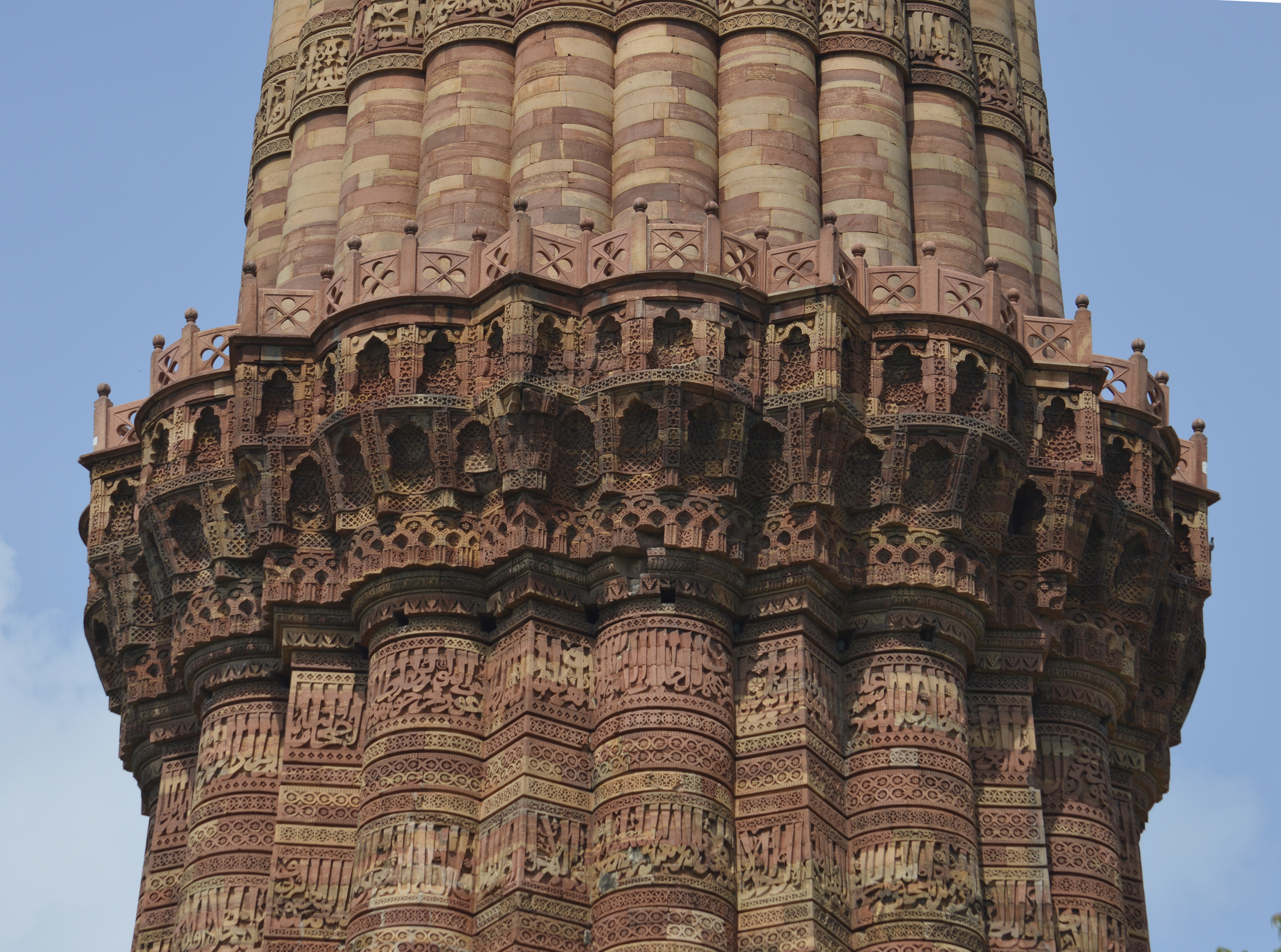
An ornate balcony at the Qutb Minar in Delhi

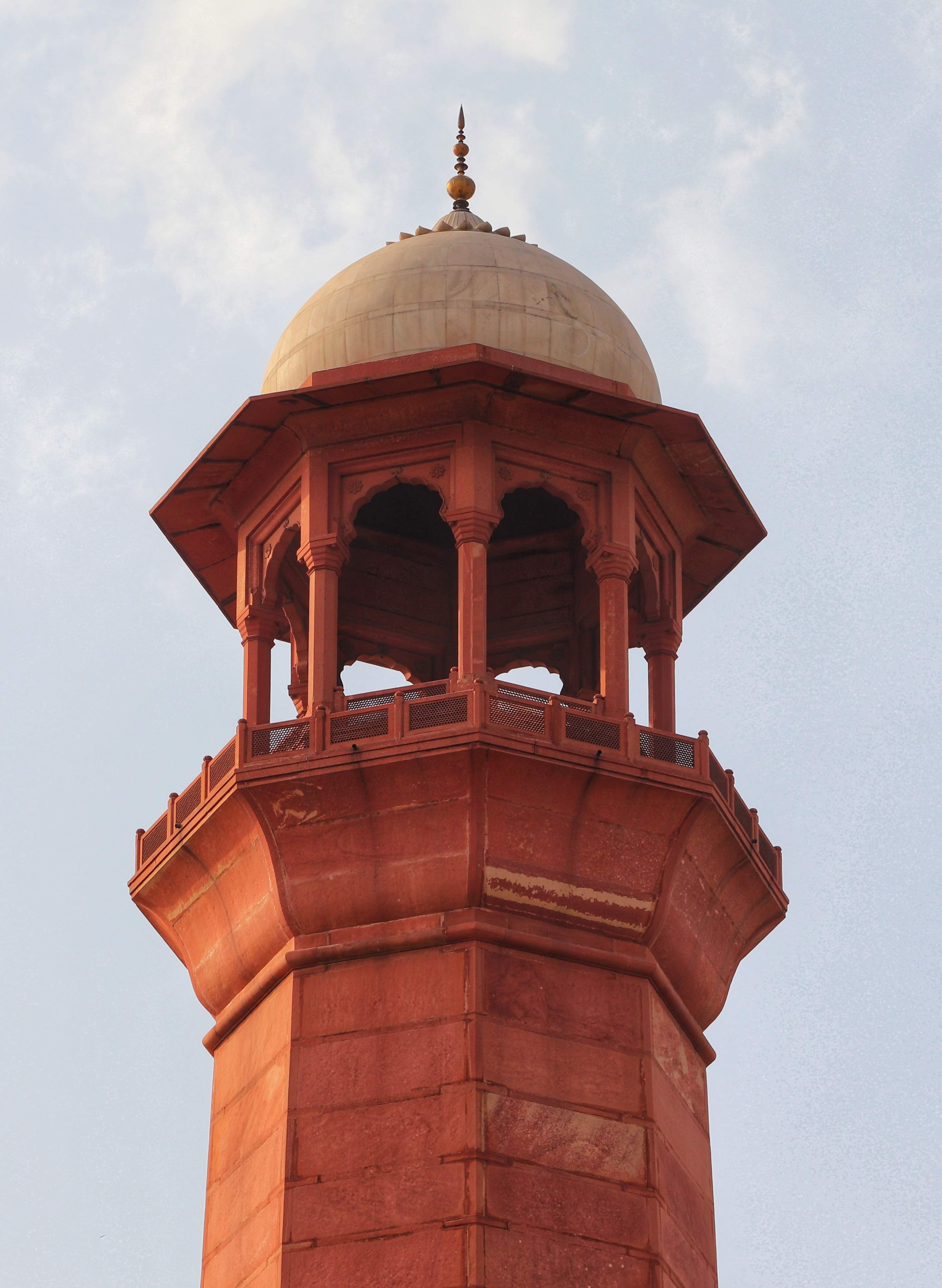
Example of a lantern structure at the top of a minaret at the Badshahi Mosque in Lahore

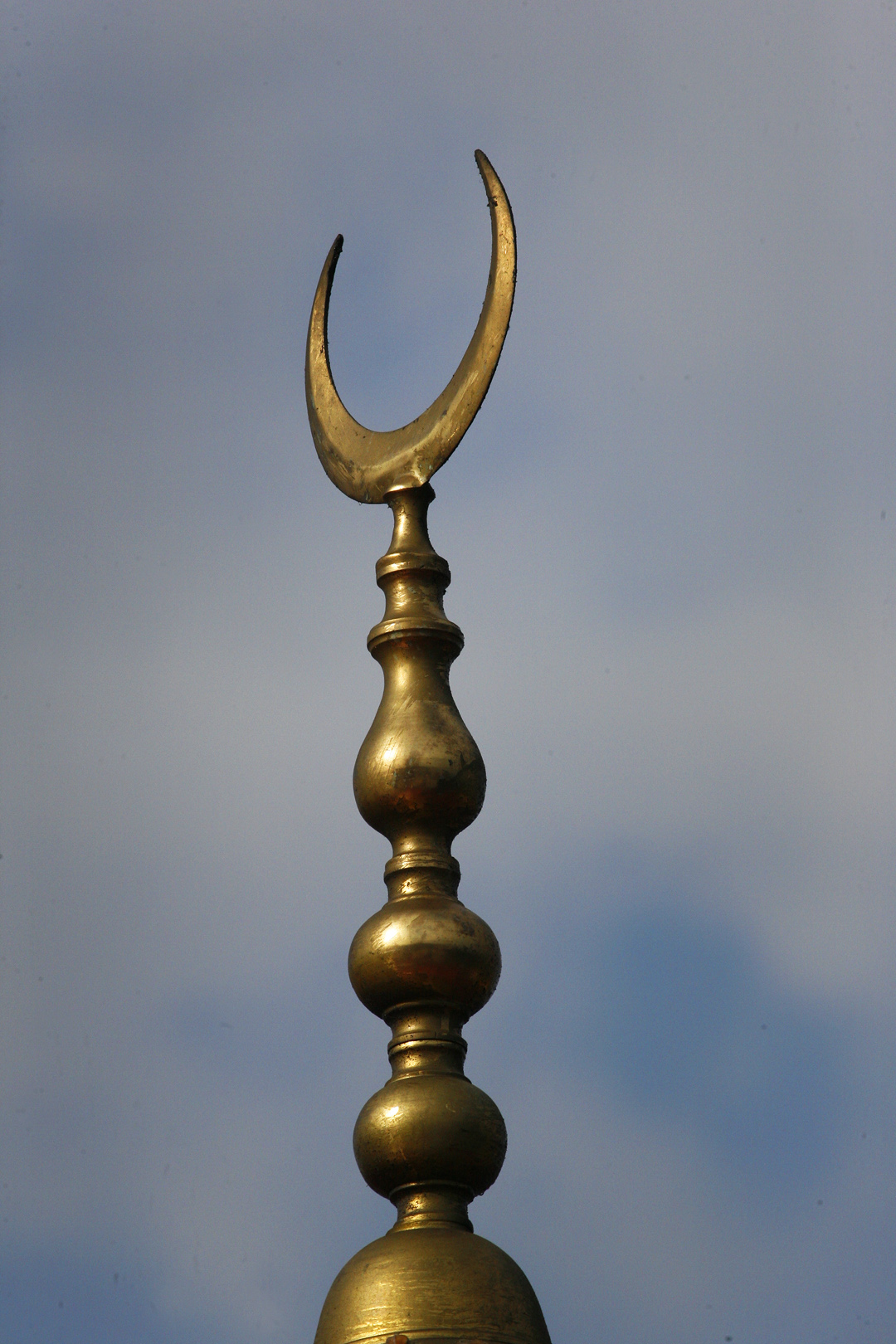
Example of a metal finial in Istanbul

== Origins ==
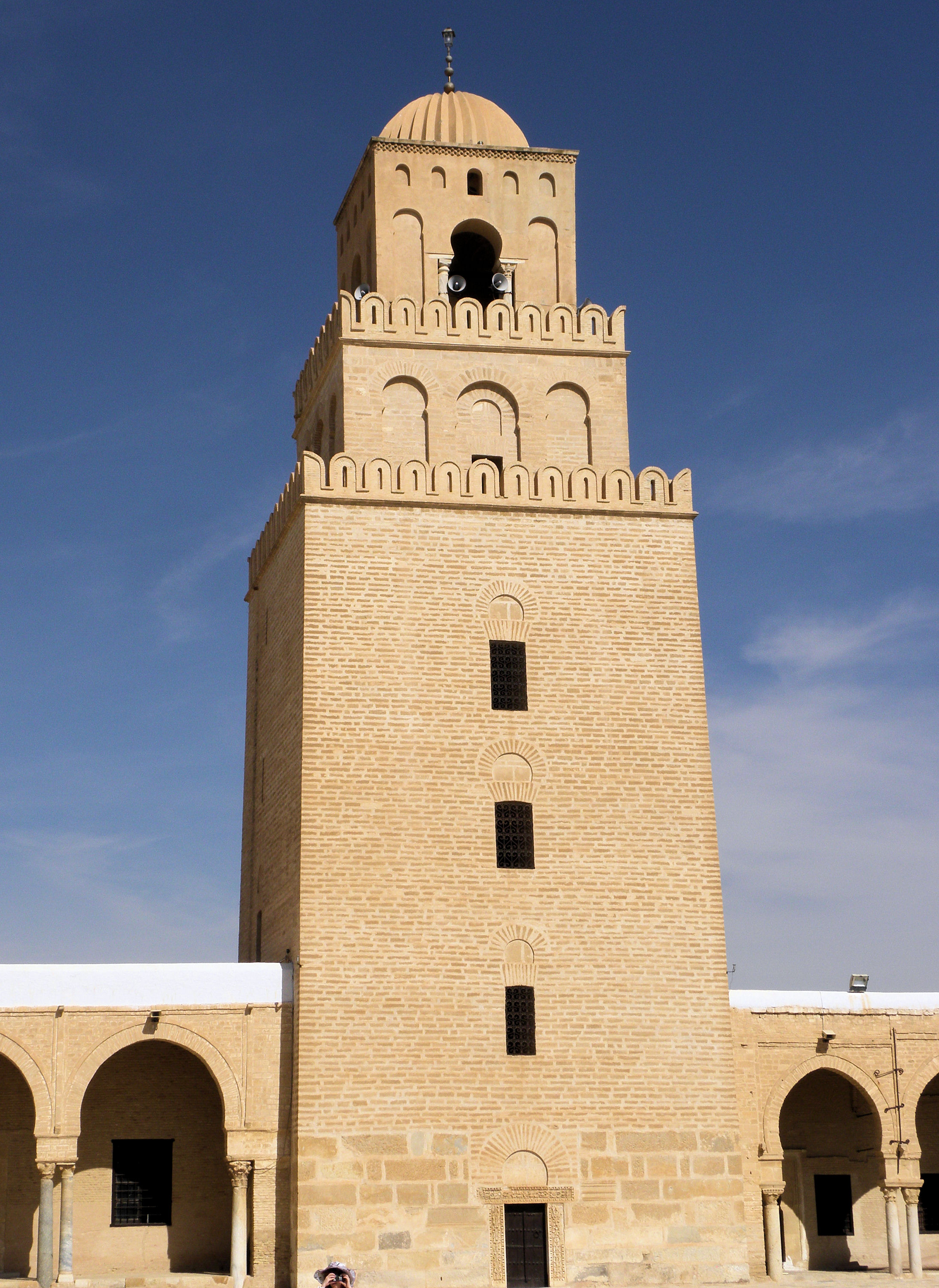
Minaret of the Great Mosque of Kairouan in Tunisia, one of the oldest surviving minarets in the world

The earliest mosques lacked minarets, and the call to prayer was often performed from smaller tower structures. The early Muslim community of Medina gave the call to prayer from the doorway or roof of the house of Muhammad, which doubled as a place for prayer, and this continued to be the practice in mosques during the period of the four Rashidun Caliphs (632–661).

The origin of the minaret is unclear. Many 19th-century and early 20th-century scholars traced the origin of minarets to the Umayyad Caliphate period (661–750) and believed that they imitated the church steeples found in Syria in those times. Others suggested that these towers were inspired by the ziggurats of Babylonian and Assyrian shrines in Mesopotamia. Some scholars, such as A. J. Butler and Hermann Thiersch, agreed that the Syrian minarets were derived from church towers but also argued that the minarets of Egypt were inspired by the form of the Pharos Lighthouse in Alexandria (which survived up until medieval times). K. A. C. Creswell, an orientalist and important early-20th-century scholar of Islamic architecture, contributed a major study on the question in 1926 which then became the standard scholarly theory on the origin of minarets for roughly fifty years.Creswell attributed the origin of minaret towers to the influence of Syrian church towers and regarded the spiral or helicoidal minarets of the Abbasid period as deriving from local ziggurat precedents, but rejected the possible influence of the Pharos Lighthouse. He also established that the earliest mosques had no minarets and he suggested that the first purpose-built minarets were built for the Mosque of Amr ibn al-As in Fustat in 673. In 1989, Jonathan Bloom published a new study which argued that the first true minaret towers did not appear until the 9th century, under Abbasid rule, and that their initial purpose was not related to the call to prayer.

References on Islamic architecture since the late 20th century often agree with Bloom's view that the mosques of the Umayyad Caliphate did not have minarets in the form of towers. Instead of towers, some Umayyad mosques were built with platforms or shelters above their roofs that were accessed by a staircase and from which the muezzins could issue the call to prayer. These structures were referred to as a mi'dhana ("place of the adhān") or as a ṣawma῾a ("monk's cell", (Note: More specifically, referring to a small room or cell, with a pointed or tapering form, where a Christian monk would seclude himself.) due to its small size). An example of these platforms is documented during the reconstruction of the Mosque of Amr ibn al-As in 673 by Mu'awiya's local governor, Maslama ibn Mukhallad al-Ansari, who was given orders by the caliph to add one to each of the mosque's four corners, similar to the Great Mosque of Damascus which had a ṣawma῾a above each of the Roman-era towers at its four corners. Historical sources also mention such features in mosques in other parts of North Africa. In another example, under the Umayyad Emirate of al-Andalus, emir Hisham I ordered the addition of a ṣawma'a to the Great Mosque of Cordoba in 793.

A possible exception to the absence of tower minarets is documented in Caliph al-Walid's renovation of the Prophet's Mosque in Medina in the early 8th century, during which he built a tower, referred to as a manāra, at each of the mosque's four corners. However, it is not clear what function these towers served. They do not appear to have been used for the call to prayer and may have been intended instead as visual symbols of the mosque's status. Historical sources also reference an earlier manāra, built of stone, being added to the mosque of Basra in 665 by the Umayyad provincial governor, but it is not entirely clear if it was a tower or what form it had, though it must have had a monumental appearance.

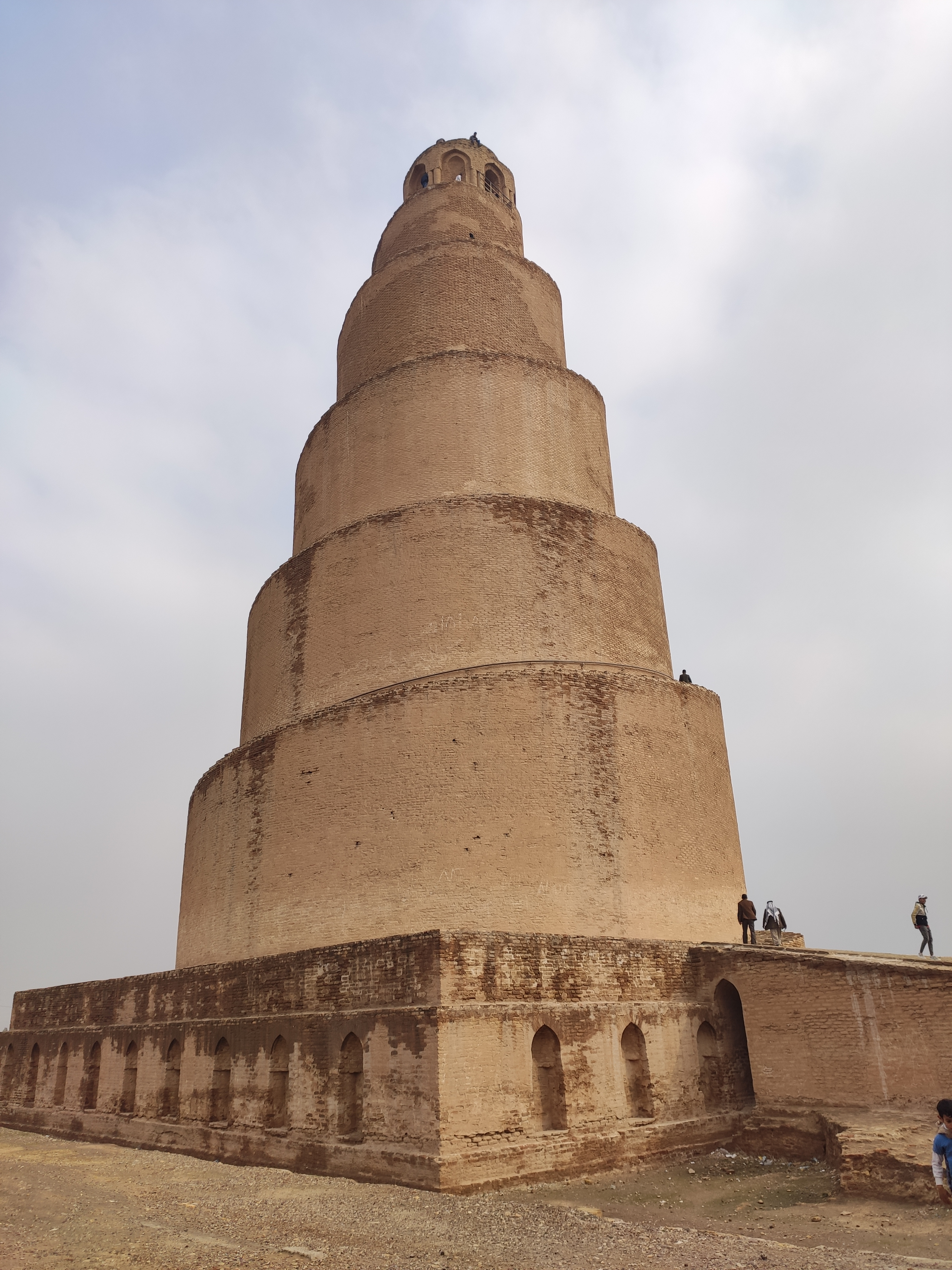
The Great Mosque of Samarra has a distinctive spiral minaret (848–852) and it is 52-meter-high (171 ft)

The first known minarets built as towers appeared under Abbasid rule. Four towers were added to the Great Mosque of Mecca during its Abbasid reconstruction in the late 8th century. In the 9th century single minaret towers were built in or near the middle of the wall opposite the qibla wall of mosques. These towers were built across the empire in a height to width ratio of around 3:1. One of the oldest minarets still standing is that of the Great Mosque of Kairouan in Tunisia, built in 836 and well-preserved today. Other minarets that date from the same period, but less precisely dated, include the minaret of the Friday Mosque of Siraf, now the oldest minaret in Iran, and the minaret opposite the qibla wall at the Great Mosque of Damascus (known as the "Minaret of the Bride"), now the oldest minaret in the region of Syria (though its upper section was probably rebuilt multiple times). In Samarra, the capital of the Abbasid Caliphate in present-day Iraq, the Great Mosque of Samarra was built in the years 848–852 and featured a massive helicoidal minaret behind its northern wall. Its design was repeated in the nearby Abu Dulaf Mosque (861). The earlier theory which proposed that these helicoidal minarets were inspired by ancient Mesopotamian ziggurats has been challenged and rejected by some later scholars including Richard Ettinghausen, Oleg Grabar, and Jonathan Bloom.

Bloom also argues that the early Abbasid minarets were not built to host the call to prayer, but were instead adopted as symbols of Islam that were suited to important congregational mosques. Their association with the muezzin and the call to prayer only developed later. As the first minaret towers were built by the Abbasids and had a symbolic value associated with them, some of the Islamic regimes opposed to the Abbasids, such as the Fatimids, generally refrained from building them during these early centuries. The earliest evidence of minarets being used for hosting the call to prayer dates to the 10th century and it was only towards the 11th century that minaret towers became a near-universal feature of mosques.

== Regional styles ==
=== Egypt ===
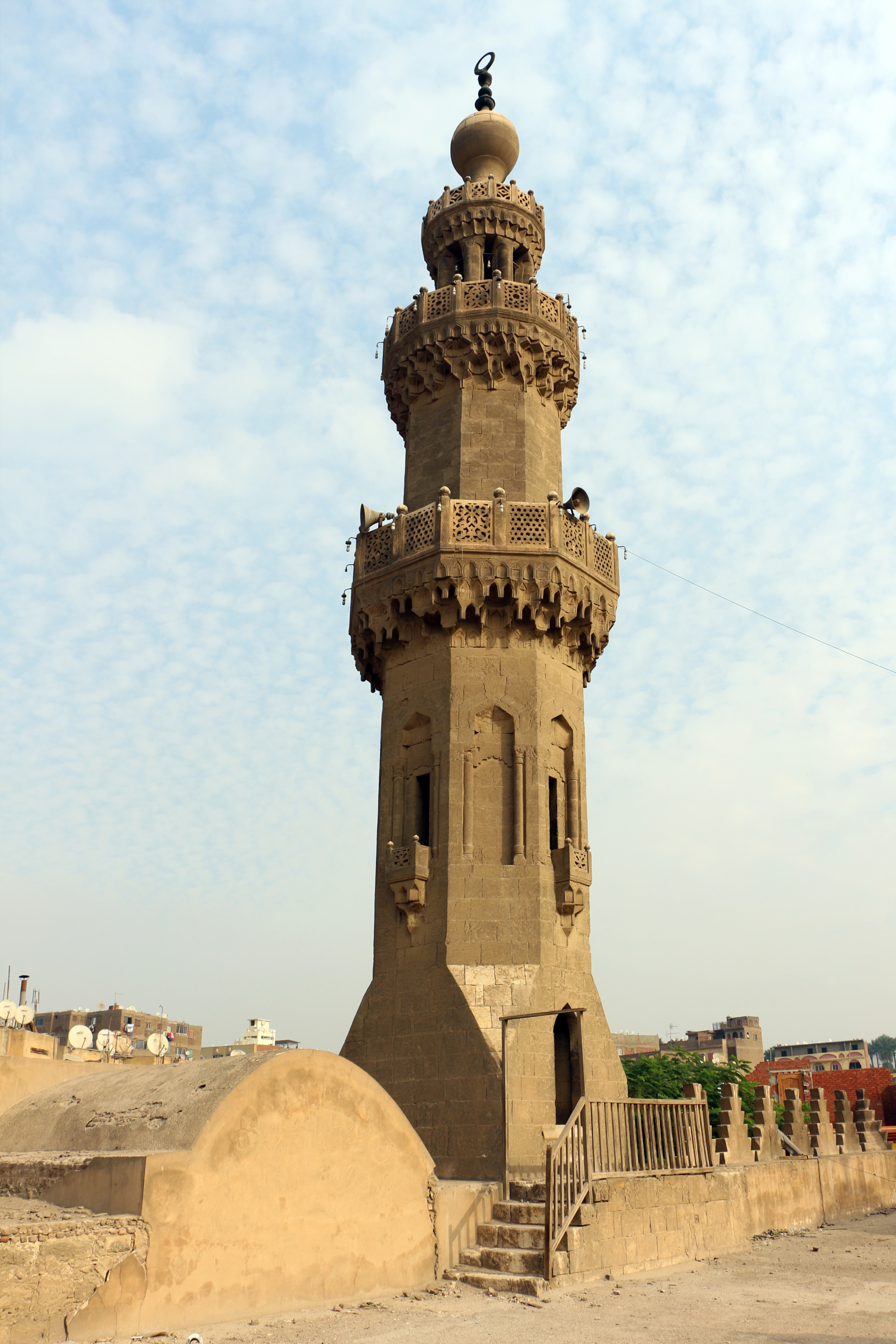
Minaret of the al-Maridani Mosque (1340), the earliest example of a style repeated in later Mamluk minarets

The style of minarets has varied throughout the history of Egypt. The minaret of the 9th-century Ibn Tulun Mosque imitated the spiral minarets of contemporary Abbasid Samarra, though the current tower was reconstructed later in 1296. Under the Fatimids (10th-12th centuries), new mosques generally lacked minarets. One unusual exception is the Mosque of al-Hakim, built between 990 and 1010, which has two minarets at its corners. The two towers have slightly different shapes: both have square bases but one has a cylindrical shaft above this and the other an octagonal shaft. This multi-tier design was only found in the minarets of the great mosques at Mecca and Medina at that time, suggesting a possible link to those designs. Shortly after their construction, the lower sections of the minarets were encased in massive square bastions, for reasons that are not clearly known, and the tops were rebuilt in 1303 by a Mamluk sultan.

Under the Ayyubids (late 12th to mid-13th centuries), the details of minarets borrowed from Fatimid designs. Most distinctively, the summits of minarets had a lantern structure topped by a pointed ribbed dome, whose appearance was compared to a mabkhara, or incense burner. This design continued under the early Bahri Mamluks (13th to early 14th century), but soon began to evolve into the shapes distinctive to Mamluk architecture. They became very ornate and usually consisted of three tiers separated by balconies, with each tier having a different design than the others. This configuration was particularly characteristic of Cairo. The minaret of the al-Maridani Mosque (circa 1340) is the first one to have an entirely octagonal shaft and the first one to end with a narrow lantern structure consisting of eight slender columns topped by a bulbous stone finial. This style later became the basic standard form of Cairene minarets, while the makhbara-style summit disappeared.

Later minarets in the Burji Mamluk period (late 14th to early 16th centuries) typically had an octagonal shaft for the first tier, a round shaft on the second, and a lantern structure with finial on the third level. The stone-carved decoration of the minaret also became very extensive and varied from minaret to minaret. Minarets with completely square or rectangular shafts reappeared at the very end of the Mamluk period during the reign of Sultan al-Ghuri (r. 1501–1516). During al-Ghuri's reign, the lantern summits were also doubled – as with the minaret of the Mosque of Qanibay Qara or al-Ghuri's minaret at the al-Azhar Mosque – or even quadrupled – as with the original minaret of al-Ghuri's madrasa.

=== Iran, Central Asia, and South Asia ===
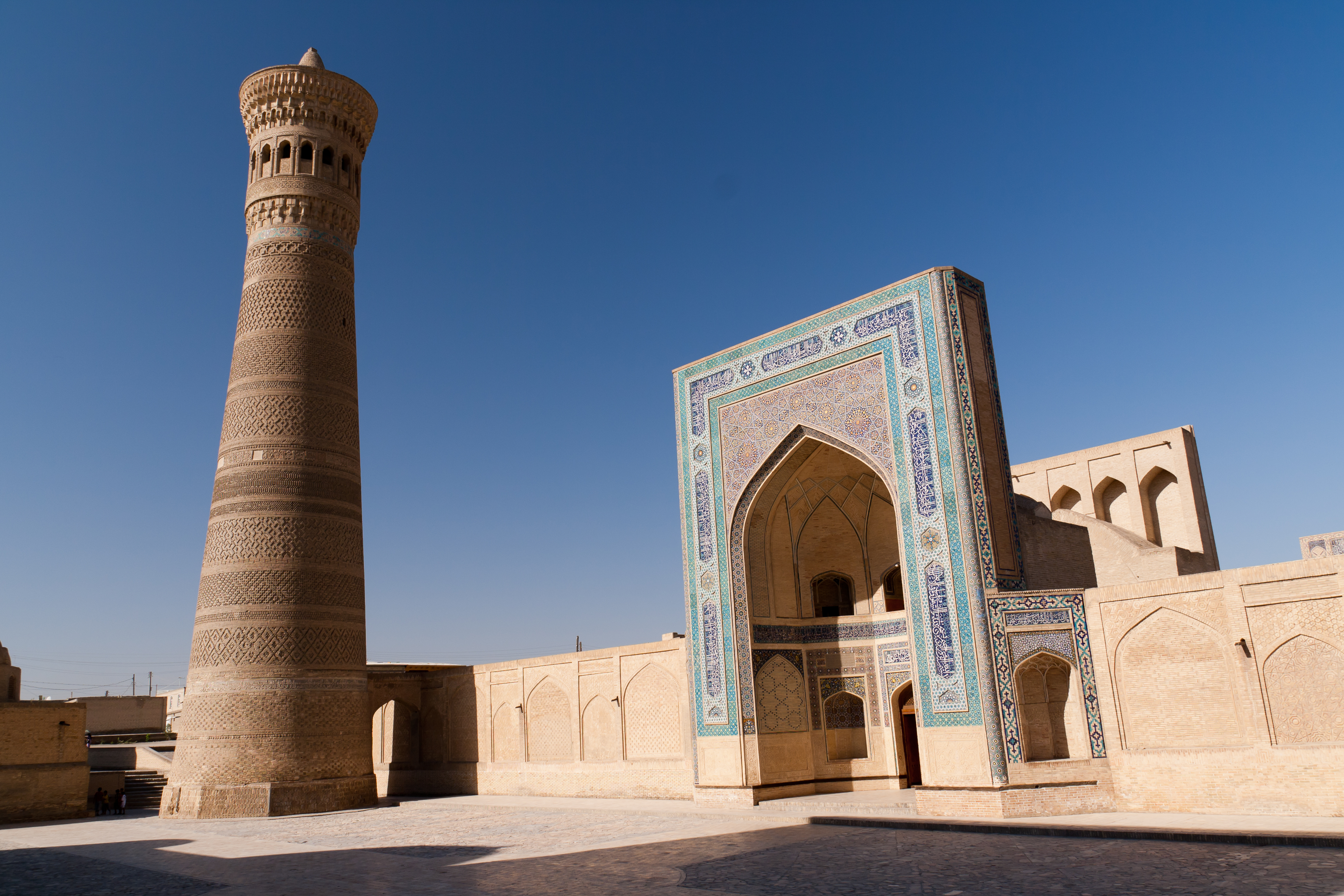
Kalyan Minaret (left) in Bukhara (1127)

Starting with the Seljuk period (11th and 12th centuries), minarets in Iran had cylindrical shafts with square or octagonal bases that taper towards their summit. These minarets became the most common style in the eastern Islamic world (in Iran, Central Asia, and South Asia). During the Seljuk period minarets were tall and highly decorated with geometric and calligraphic design. They were built prolifically, even at smaller mosques or mosque complexes. The Kalyan Minaret in Bukhara remains the most well known of the Seljuk minarets for its use of brick patterned decoration. The tallest minaret of this era, the Minaret of Jam, in a remote area of present-day Afghanistan, was built c. 1175 by the Ghurids and features elaborate brick decoration and inscriptions. The Qutb Minar in Delhi, the most monumental minaret in India, was built in 1199 and was designed on the same model as the Minaret of Jam.

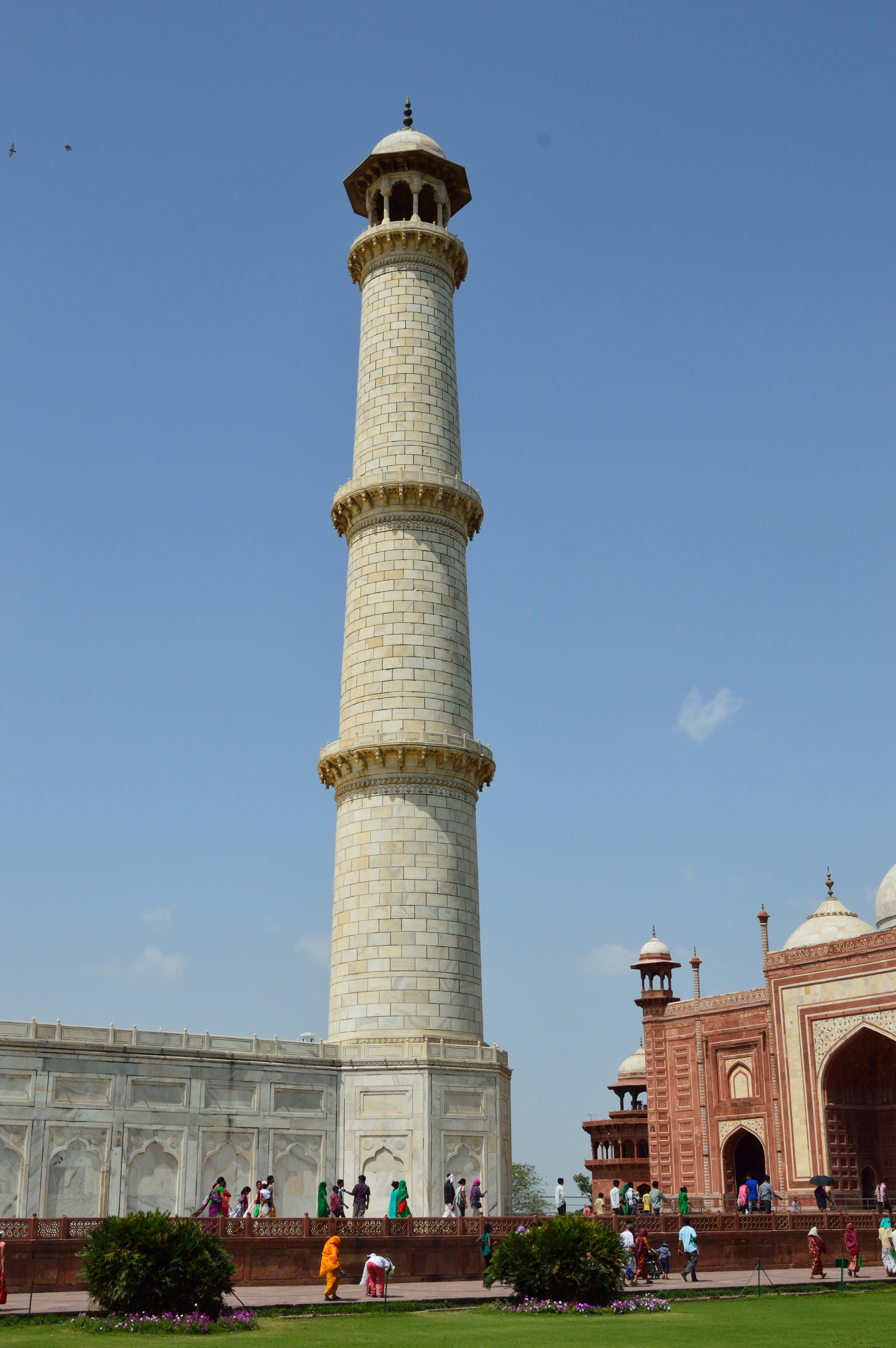
One of the minarets of the Taj Mahal in Agra (1643)

In later periods, however, minarets in this region became generally less monumental in comparison with the mosques for which they were built. The tradition of building pairs of minarets probably began in the 12th century, but it became especially prominent under the Ilkhanids (13th-14th centuries), who built twin minarets flanking important iwans such as the mosque's entrance.

The rise of the Timurid Empire, which heavily patronized art and architecture, led to what is now called the "international Timurid" style which spread from Central Asia during and after the 15th century. It is categorized by the use of multiple minarets. Examples of this style include the monuments of Mughal architecture in the Indian subcontinent, such as the minarets on the roof of the south gate in Akbar's Tomb at Sikandra (1613), the minarets on the Tomb of Jahangir (1628-1638), and the four minarets surrounding the mausoleum of the Taj Mahal. Elsewhere in India, some cities and towns along the coast have small mosques with simple staircase minarets.

=== Iraq ===
The oldest minarets in Iraq date from the Abbasid period. The Great Mosque of Samarra (848–852) is accompanied by one of the earliest preserved minarets, a 50-metre-high (160 ft) cylindrical brick tower with a spiral staircase wrapped around it, standing outside the walls of the mosque. It is the tallest of the early minarets of the Abbasid period and remains the most massive historic minaret in the world, involving over 6000 cubic meters of brick masonry. The Abu Dulaf Mosque, built near Samarra and finished in 861, has a smaller minaret of similar shape.

In the later Abbasid period (11th to 13th centuries), after the Seljuk period, minarets were typically cylindrical brick towers whose square or polygonal bases were integrated into the structure of the mosque itself. Their main cylindrical shafts were tapered and culminated in muqarnas cornices supporting a balcony, above which is another small cylindrical turret topped by a dome. Two examples of this style are the Mosque of al-Khaffafin and the Mosque of Qumriyya.

=== Maghreb and al-Andalus ===
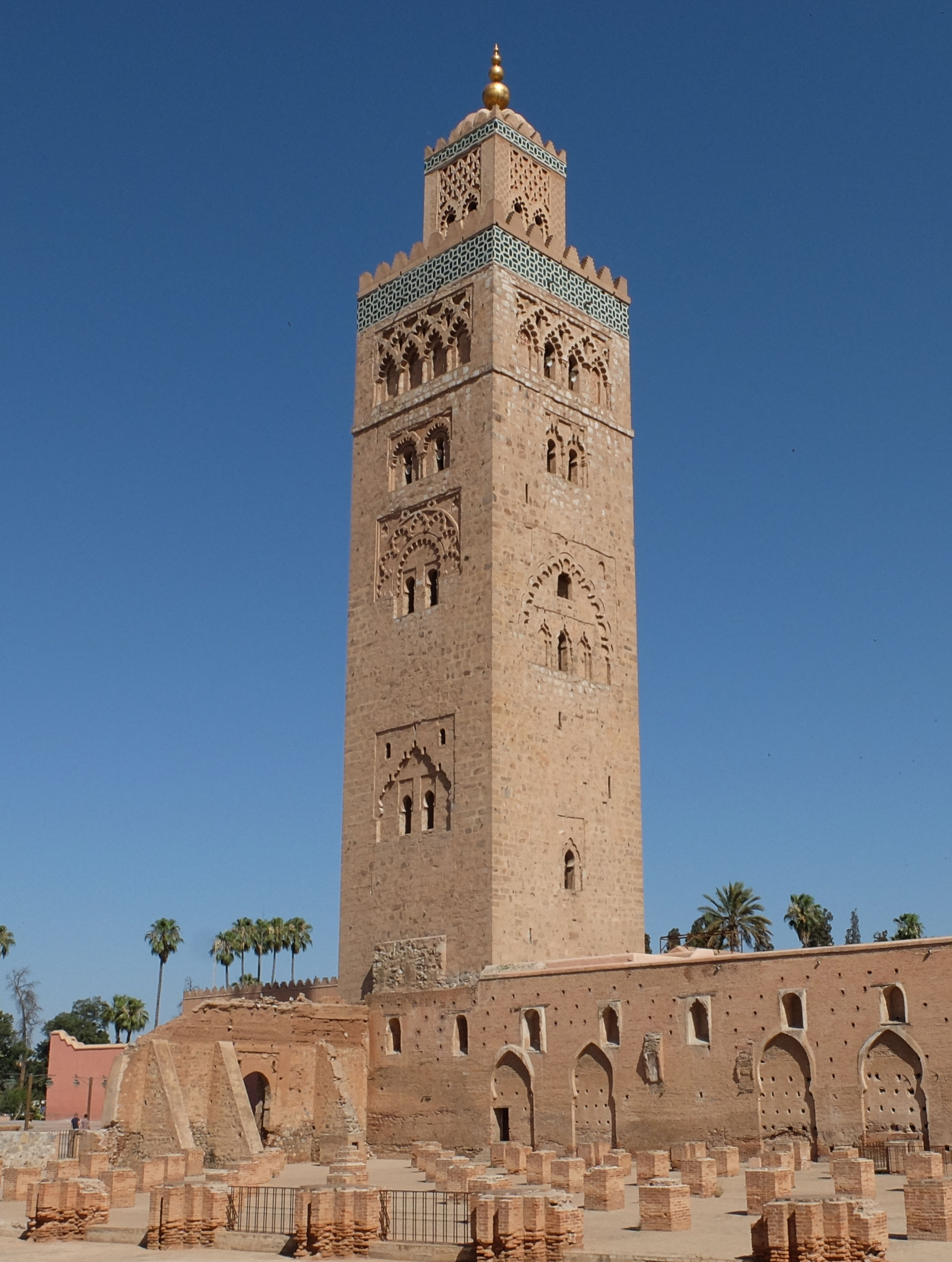
Minaret of the Kutubiyya Mosque in Marrakesh (second half of 12th century)

Minarets in the Maghreb (region encompassing present-day Algeria, Libya, Mauritania, Morocco, Tunisia, and Western Sahara) and historical al-Andalus (present-day Gibraltar, Portugal, Spain, and Southern France) traditionally have a square shaft and are arranged in two tiers: the main shaft, which makes up most of its height, and a much smaller secondary tower above this which is in turn topped by a finial of copper or brass spheres. Some minarets in the Maghreb have octagonal shafts, though this is more characteristic of certain regions or periods; e.g. the minarets of the Great Mosque of Chefchaouen, the Great Mosque of Ouazzane, the Kasbah Mosque of Tangier, and the Great Mosque of Asilah in Morocco or the Ottoman-era minarets of Tunisia such as the Youssef Dey Mosque and the Hammouda Pacha Mosque. Inside the main shaft a staircase, and in other cases a ramp, ascends to the top of the minaret.

The minaret at the Great Mosque of Kairouan, built in 836 under Aghlabid rule, is the oldest minaret in North Africa and one of the oldest minarets in the world. It has the shape of a massive tower with a square base, three levels of decreasing widths, and a total height of 31.5 meters. The first two levels are from the original 9th-century construction but the third level was reconstructed at a later period. Another important minaret for the architectural history of the region is the minaret built by Abd ar-Rahman III for the Great Mosque of Cordoba in 951–952, which became the model for later minarets in the Maghreb and al-Andalus. Jonathan Bloom has suggested that Abd ar-Rahman III's construction of the minaret – along with his sponsoring of other minarets around the same time in Fez – was partly intended as a visual symbol of his self-declared authority as caliph and may have also been aimed at defying the rival Fatimid Caliphs to the east who did not endorse the construction of minarets at the time. Other important historic minarets in the region are the Almohad-era minarets of the Kutubiyya Mosque and the Kasbah Mosque in Marrakesh, the Hassan Tower in Rabat, and the Giralda in Seville, all from the 12th and early 13th centuries.

=== Turkey ===
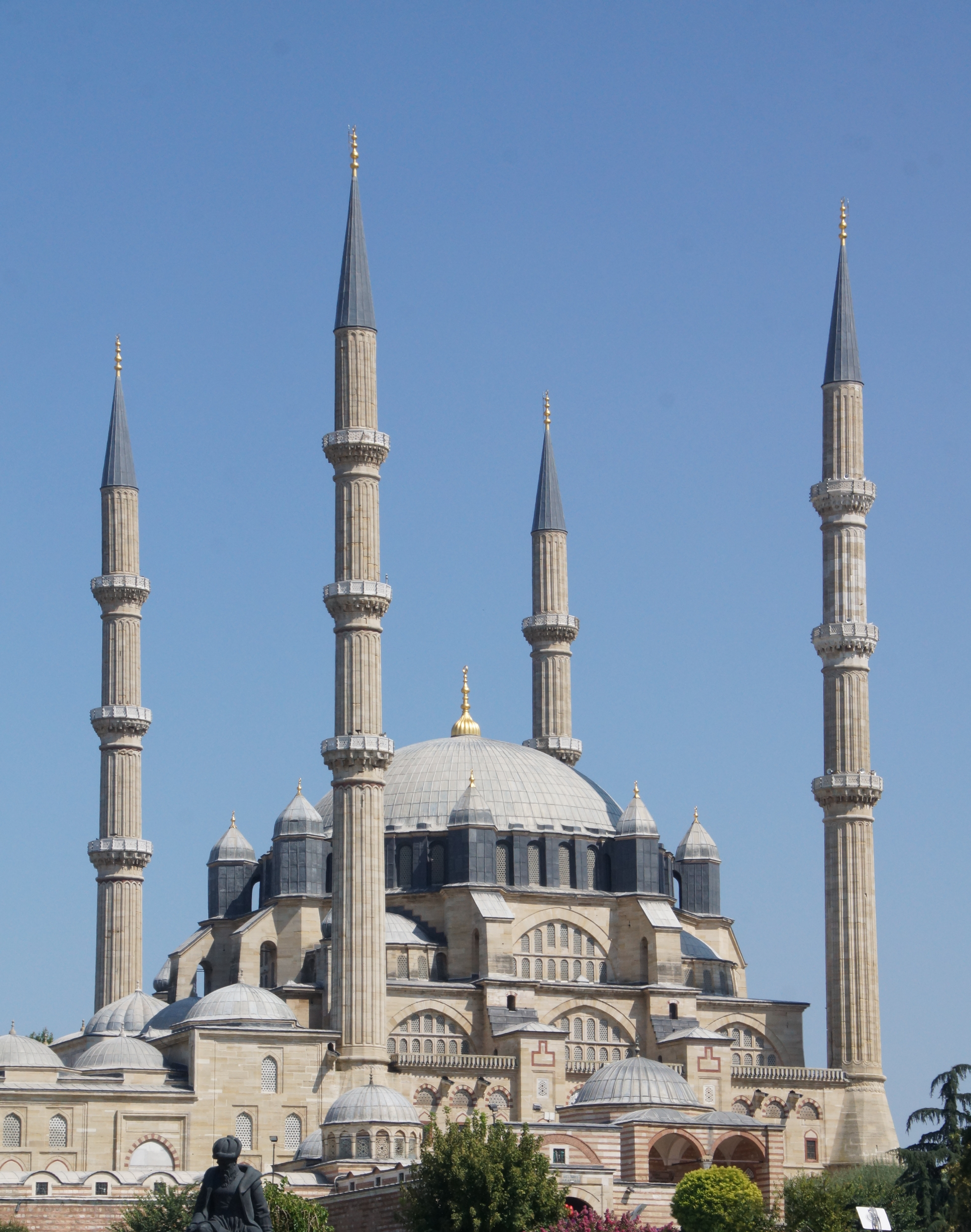
The Selimiye Mosque in Edirne (1574), which features the four tallest Ottoman minarets

The Seljuks of Rum, a successor state of the Seljuk Empire, built paired portal minarets from brick that had Iranian origins. In general, mosques in Anatolia had only one minaret and received decorative emphasis while most of the mosque remained plain. Seljuk minarets were built of stone or brick, usually resting on a stone base, and typically had a cylindrical or polygonal shaft that is less slender than later Ottoman minarets. They were sometimes embellished with decorative brickwork or glazed ceramic decoration up the level of their balconies.

Ottoman architecture followed earlier Seljuk models and continued the Iranian tradition of cylindrical tapering minaret forms with a square base. Classical Ottoman minarets are described as "pencil-shaped" due to their slenderness and sharply-pointed summits, often topped with a crescent moon symbol. The presence of more than one minaret, and of larger minarets, was reserved for mosques commissioned by the Ottoman sultans themselves such as the Süleymaniye Mosque. Taller minarets often also had multiple balconies (known as şerefe in Turkish) along their shafts instead of one. The Üç Şerefeli Mosque in Edirne, finished in 1447, was the first sultanic mosque to have multiple minarets with multiple balconies. Of its four minarets, the northwestern minaret was the tallest Ottoman minaret up to that time, rising to 67 metres. Its height was only surpassed by the minarets of the Selimiye Mosque in Edirne (1574), which are 70.89 meters tall and are the tallest minarets in Ottoman architecture. Later Ottoman minarets also became plainer and more uniform in design. The trend of multiple minarets culminated in the six minarets of the Sultan Ahmed Mosque (also known as the Blue Mosque) in Istanbul.

=== China ===
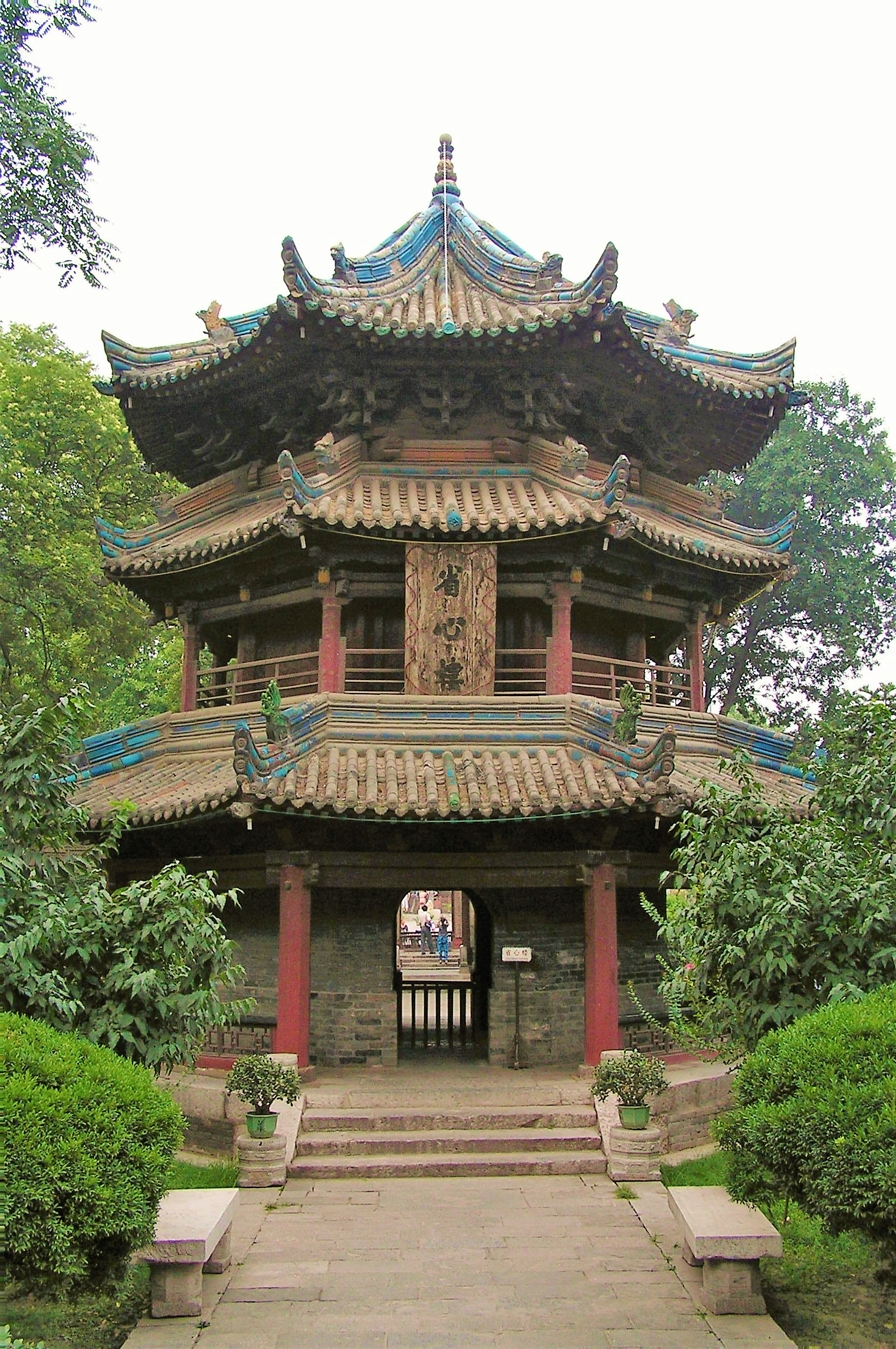
Minaret at the Great Mosque of Xi'an, the mosque was established in the 8th century

Next to the Huaisheng Mosque in Guangzhou is the Tower of Light, also known as the Guangta minaret (1350). The mosque and the minaret merge aspects of Islamic and Chinese architecture. Its circular shaft and the double staircase arrangement inside it resembles the minarets of earlier Iranian and Central Asian architecture, such as the 12th-century Minaret of Jam and the minaret of Sangbast. The Great Mosque of Xi'an includes an octagonal pagoda-style wooden minaret with a triple-eaves roof.

== See also ==
- Bell tower
- List of oldest minarets
- List of tallest minarets
- 2009 Swiss minaret referendum
- List of tallest mosques
