= Kasbah Mosque, Tangier =

Mosque of the royal citadel of the old city

Kasbah Mosque
- جامع القصبة
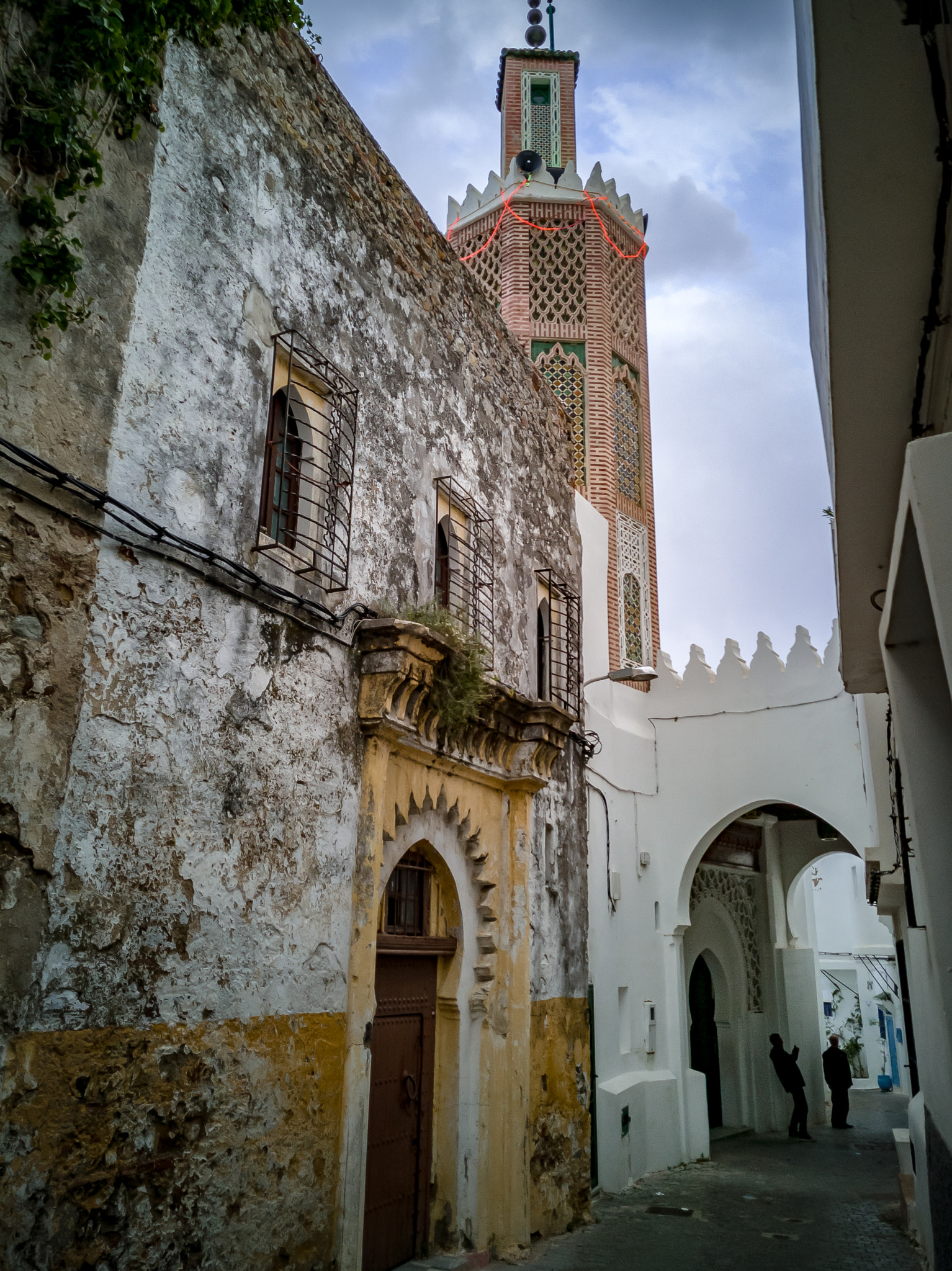
- View of the mosque from the street

Religion
- Affiliation: Islam
- Patron: Moulay Ismail
- Status: active

Location
- Location: Tangier, Morocco
- Interactive map of Kasbah Mosque
- Coordinates: 35°47′17″N 5°48′45″W

Architecture
- Type: mosque
- Style: Alaouite, Moroccan, Moorish
- Founder: Ali ibn Abdallah Errifi
- Established: After 1684
- Minaret: 1

The Kasbah Mosque (Arabic: جامع القصبة) is a mosque in Tangier, Morocco, and the main mosque (Friday mosque) of the historic royal citadel (kasbah) in the old city (medina) of Tangier. It dates to the late 17th century.

== History ==
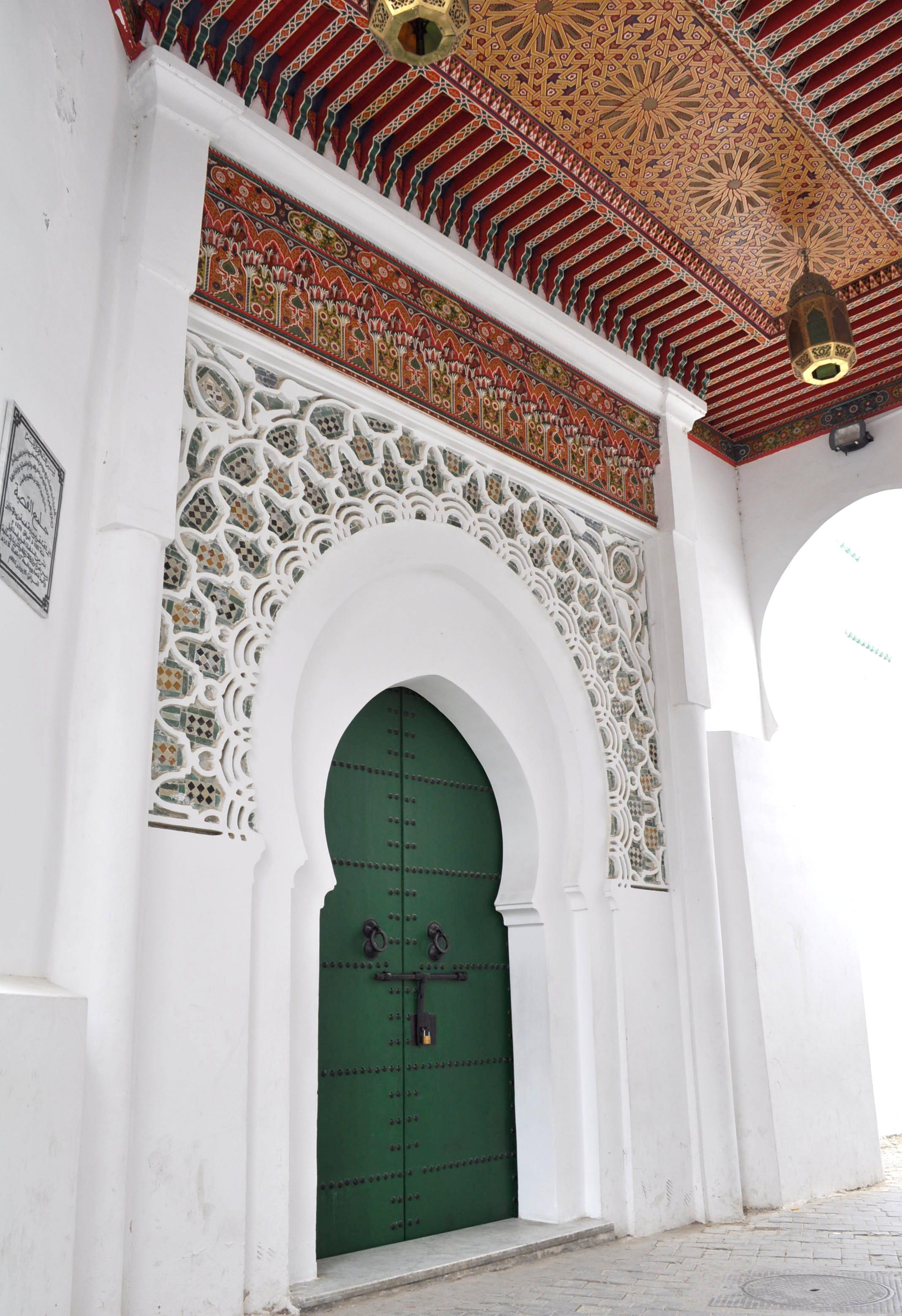
Entrance doorway to the mosque

The kasbah (citadel) of Tangier was built right after the city was evacuated by the English in 1684 and reclaimed by Morocco. The sultan of Morocco, Moulay Ismail, supported the city's resettlement and commissioned its reconstruction, overseen by its new governor, Ali ibn Abdallah Errifi. As the English blew up the city's fortifications before leaving, the city's defenses had to be almost entirely rebuilt. One part of this reconstruction involved establishing the Moroccan government's seat of power in the city within a self-contained fortified district, the kasbah (much as in other traditional Moroccan cities). This district had its own walls and included the Kasbah Palace with the governor's residence, a treasury, a courthouse, prisons, stables, residential quarters for the military, a parade ground or mechouar, and the mosque.

The mosque of the kasbah of Tangier was thus built by Ali Errifi, under Moulay Ismail's reign in the late 17th century. Errifi was also responsible for rebuilding the city's Grand Mosque further south. The mosque was expanded by Errifi's grandson, Ahmed, who added its minaret and ornate entrance. Its prayer hall was expanded under Sultan Muhammad ibn Abd al-Rahman (Mohammed IV), who ruled between 1859 and 1873. It was restored around 1889 for the visit of Sultan Moulay Hassan I. In 1921, the official in charge of religious foundations (habous) in the region restored the mosque but covered up much of its original decoration in the process, using new colors. Some of this cover-up has been cleared in recent years during renovations that finished around 2015.

== Description ==
View of the minaret from the rooftop of a local house (2024)

The mosque is adjacent to the palace complex of the kasbah (now a museum), directly to its south. The mosque's interior is relatively plain, with white walls and rows of white Moorish arches (like many Moroccan mosques). It has a nearly plain mihrab (niche or arched alcove symbolizing the direction of prayer), and its small rectangular courtyard is not open to the sky but is roofed over. Its most distinguished elements are on the exterior. The entrance is on Ibn Abbou Street (an alley near the entrance to the museum/palace), sheltered under a small arched passageway covering the street at this point. The doorway, also shaped like a Moorish arch, is decorated with typical radiating geometric motifs whose empty spaces are filled with colorful zellij tilework. The minaret, rising above the entrance, is notable for having an octagonal shaft (instead of a square shaft like most Moroccan minarets) and for its decoration. Its facades are decorated with ornate blind arches, filled again with multicolored zellij tilework, and panels of sebka geometric motifs.

== See also ==
- Grand Mosque of Tangier
- List of mosques in Morocco
