= Baháʼí Faith in Morocco =

The history of the Baháʼí Faith in Morocco began around 1946. In 1953 the Baháʼís initiated a Ten Year Crusade during which a number of Baháʼís pioneered to various parts of Morocco—many of whom came from Egypt and a few from the United States including Helen Elsie Austin. By April 1955 the first Baháʼí Local Spiritual Assembly of Ceuta was elected. By January 1958 the first Baháʼí summer school was held in Rabat. By spring 1958 the Baháʼí population may have been 100 and there were six assemblies and a regional committee coordinated activities promulgating the religion. In 1960 the first all-Moroccan local assembly was elected in Zaouiat Cheikh and most of its members were Berbers. On December 7, 1961, an article in Al-Alam lamented the decline of Islam and criticized the Baháʼís. During the year Baháʼí homes are entered by police and literature of the religion is taken. On April 12 four Baháʼís are arrested in Nador. A regional National Spiritual Assembly of North West Africa was organized which included Morocco in 1962. In 1963 a survey of the community counted 10 Assemblies, 12 organized groups (between 1 and 9 adults) of Baháʼís. In 1963 the arrests in Morocco had gotten attention from Hassan II of Morocco, US Senator Kenneth B. Keating and Roger Nash Baldwin, then Chairman of the International League for the Rights of Man and would echo in analyses of politics of Morocco for years to come. All Baháʼí meetings were prohibited in 1983 followed by arrests. This time the response emphasized the non-partisan and obedience to government principles of the religion. 1992 estimates by the US Department of State counted some 150-200 Baháʼís. while 2001 through 2009 estimates mention the Baháʼí community at 350 to 400 persons.

== Early phase ==
There is a mention of contact with a Baháʼí in Morocco in 1946 but it's unclear with division (Spanish, French, International Zone.) In August 1947 Marie Claudet, former member of the Baha'i Assembly of Guayaquil (Ecuador) was reported in May to be en route to French Morocco. In 1953 the Baháʼís initiated a Ten Year Crusade during which a number of Baháʼís pioneered to various parts of Morocco—many of whom came from Egypt and a few from the United States. Starting in September for the Moroccan International Zone they first to arrive were: Manouchehr Hezari, and Hurmuz Zindih. Manouchehr Hezari earned the title of Knight of Baháʼu'lláh as the very first to settle in Tangier (then an international city). The family stayed many years after Tangier was annexed by the Kingdom of Morocco. Manouchehr worked as an engineer and later as a station manager for Voice of America radio. Then in October more arrivals came—Dr. Helen Elsie Austin and Muhammad-ʻAli Jalili came. In November Husayn & Nusraat Ardikani, ʻAli Akhbar & S͟hayistih Rafiʼi, and ʻAbbas Rafiʼi arrived. For Spanish Morocco in October 1953 they were: Fawzi Zaynu'l-'Abidin & family, Luella McKay, John & Earleta Fleming, and Alyce Janssen. Others arrived in April 1954—Richard & Evelyn Walters and Richard & Mary L. Suhm. Helen Austin was teaching at the American School of Tangier from 1954 to 1957. She was a member of the regional National Assembly of North and West Africa (1953–58), and, in her lifetime, Local Spiritual Assemblies in five countries—including Morocco. Another American family pioneered to Morocco starting in 1956 up to 1960, one returning for a period in 1967–8. By February 1955 there is mention of conversions from the Moroccan population. By April 1955 the first Local Spiritual Assembly of Ceuta, an enclave of Spain in Morocco, was elected. Sometime during 1956 a Roman Catholic priest lodges a complaint against the Baháʼís of Morocco with the Moroccan Security Service. By January 1958 the first Baháʼí Summer School was held in Rabat. By spring 1958 the Baháʼí population may have been 100 and there were six assemblies and a regional committee is coordinating activities promulgating the religion. In 1960 the first all-Moroccan local assembly was elected in Zaouiat Cheikh and most of its members were Berbers. A regional National Spiritual Assembly for North East is organized in 1956. In 1957 the first Tuareg joins the religion. Louella McKay was another pioneer from about spring 1959 through the fall of 1963 in Spanish Morocco.

A regional National Spiritual Assembly of North West Africa was organized in 1962-3 including the merging countries of French, Spanish Morocco and the Moroccan International Zone centered on Tangiers. In 1963 a survey of the community counted 10 Assemblies, 12 organized groups of Baháʼís and 8 isolated individuals. The assemblies were: Casablanca, Ceuta, Fez, Kenitra, Larache, Marrakesh, Meknès, Nador, Rabat, Sala, Tetuan and Zaouiat Cheikh.

== Growth ==
=== Persecution ===
In Morocco there were episodes of religious persecution in 1962–1963, on the basis of condemnation from Allal El Fassi when 15 Baháʼís were arrested for their religious convictions; three were given death sentences. On December 7, 1961, an article in Al Alam laments the decline of Islam and attacks the Baháʼís. During the year Baháʼí homes are entered by police and literature of the religion is taken. On April 12 four Baháʼís are arrested in Nador. In September the Baháʼís in the United States contacted Hassan II of Morocco during a visit to the United Nations. On October 31, fourteen Baháʼís are arrested and are charged with rebellion, disorder, attacks on public security, being an association of criminals, and attacking religious faith. On 10 December the trial begins with charges of sedition. On the 14th the verdict is given—four are acquitted as they claim to be Muslims, one is acquitted through family connections, one is released on 15 years probation, five are committed to life imprisonment and three are sentenced to death. The sentences are appealed to the Moroccan supreme court. Initially Baháʼís did not publicize the events. On December 17, 1962, news is released among the Baháʼís and efforts are aimed at asking for the applicability of the UN charter which condemns religious intolerance. On January 31 Roger Nash Baldwin, then Chairman of the International League for the Rights of Man, appeared before a UN sub-commission of Preventing Discrimination and Protection of Minorities and states that, as far as they knew, the Baháʼí prisoners in Morocco are the only example in recent history where members of a religions have been condemned to death solely for holding and expressing religious views regarded as heretical. This appeal through the UN was supported by nearly the entire body of the Harvard Divinity School. There were months of diplomatic efforts; US Senator Kenneth B. Keating stated in the U.S. Senate on February 18, 1963, "How far religious freedom under the Moroccan Constitution really applies, will be revealed in the coming weeks when the appeal before the Supreme Court [of Morocco] is heard." On March 31, 1963, during a visit to the United States and the United Nations, Hassan II of Morocco was interviewed on television on Meet the Press then with Lawrence E. Spivak and was asked about the treatment of Baháʼís in his own country. He addressed the audience saying that the Baháʼí Faith was not a religion and "against good order and also morals". However, on April 2 he makes a public statement that if the Supreme Court confirms the penalty of death that he would grant them a royal pardon. However, on November 23 the Supreme Court hears the appeals and reversed the decision of the lower court. On December 13 the prisoners are actually released. Coverage in newspapers of the day included Wisconsin, Winnipeg and Lethbridge, Canada and Elyria Ohio as well as the New York Times. The New Republic January 25, 1964, issue had an article by Roger Nash Baldwin, founder of the American Civil Liberties Union and member of the International League for the Rights of Man (an organization accredited by the UN which aims to spread civil liberties around the world). Baldwin mentions how the League, by applying public pressure on the King of Morocco helped save the lives of the Baháʼí prisoners who had been sentenced to death. Baldwin was quoted discussing the League, "All this adds up to the very tiny beginnings of a system by which the UN itself would examine and process complaints and ultimately help set up a world court of human rights."

Morocco, Old Land, New Nation published in 1966 discusses briefly the exploitation of the religion by a Moroccan political party, in an effort to dramatize a claim "to be the stanch defender of faith and country," and the resultant persecution and imprisonment of several young Baha'i men from Nador. Concerning the Faith, the authors write: "The attractiveness of the movement stemmed from its belief in world brotherhood (a factor in its recent appeal in certain parts of Africa), the dedication of its organizers, and the vitality of its discussions, which contrasted sharply with the small concern in Morocco with the possibility of modernizing Islam." The reactions of various Moroccan leaders, newspaper publicity, and the final reversal of the convictions are noted.

=== Development of the community ===
The first summer school of Morocco for Baháʼís was held in Meknes, from August 31 to September 6. Over twenty participants were gathered on a farm situated in a suburb of Meknes, belonging to one of the Persian pioneers, Hossein Rowhani Ardakani. The city of Meknes, with more than seventy registered Baha'is, has the largest Baháʼí community in Morocco in 1964. Baháʼís from Morocco, Tunisia, Belgium, England, Monte Carlo and the Netherlands attended a school in Périgueux, France and shared news of the progress of the religion in their countries. Before June 1965 Hand of the Cause Taráz'u'lláh Samandarí visited the Baháʼís of Morocco. The Rabat Baháʼí community hosted the May 1–2, 1965 convention for the regional national assembly of North West Africa. All the delegates, except one, were present. The three Benelux countries held their schools at a combined site at De Vechtstrom in the northern Netherlands from August 23 through 30 1965 together with 150 attendees from fifteen countries including Morocco, Tunisia, Japan, Great Britain, United States and others from Europe. The second summer school of Morocco was held in Meknes, August 23 to 29, 1965 with about one hundred Baháʼís and inquirers and for the first time a greater number of women were present than at previous schools. Issam Tahan died on August 8, 1965, in London during treatment for heart problems. He was the small boy who, while his father was in prison in Morocco, chanted a prayer before the audience at the first Baháʼí World Congress. A summer school in Meknes was held August 1–7, 1966, which attracted about forty participants. Basic courses on administration and history were given, with additional lectures on special topics such as Women and the Baháʼí Faith, Baháʼí Faith and education, and a special study of the Message of the Universal House of Justice to Baháʼí youth. The first winter school was held in Rabat February 25–26, 1967 with twenty-five communities represented. In before fall 1967 Hands of the Cause William Sears and Shuʼáʼu'lláh ʻAláʼí met with the Baháʼís in Casablanca and the regional national assembly for a week. The fifth national summer school was held in Meknes September 3–9, 1967, with about 70 attendees from 14 localities. A young girl from Marrakech delivered a prepared lecture on the role of women in the Baha'i Faith presenting an example of women as efficient and active participants. The annual convention for the regional assembly was held in Rabat in April 1968. An international conference was held in Madrid in early April, 1969, organized by the National Youth Committee of Spain with over thirty young Baha'is attendees, representing Austria, England, France, Italy, Morocco, Portugal, Spain, and Switzerland. In 1968 a Baháʼí was arrested and would spend four years in prison. The 1970 French summer school, held at Annecy/Sevrier from August 30 to September 8, had attendees of 150 persons from Germany, England, Belgium, Denmark, India, Luxembourg, Dominica, Morocco, Sweden, Switzerland, Tunisia. However, in 1970 the annual Convention did not take place due to the situation in Morocco. The elections were accomplished through mail correspondence. On October 6, 1971, Morassa (Yazdi) Rawhani, a pioneer since February 1957, died. She had actively participated in the formation of two assemblies of Rabat and Sale. Her burial in the Baháʼí Cemetery at Rabat, was attended by a large number of believers of Morocco, the majority native believers; also in attendance was a representative from the Iranian Embassy in Rabat. After four years of imprisonment Allal Rouhani has been released and on January 30, 1972, the National Spiritual Assembly of the Baháʼís of North-West Africa held a luncheon attended by about sixty Baháʼís and friends from all the local assemblies in the area. The Universal House of Justice was represented by Salim Nounou from France.

In 1975 the regional assembly of North West Africa was split into North and West separately. The regional National Assembly of Northern Africa included Egypt, Libya, Tunisia, Algeria, Morocco and Spanish Sahara. In July 1975 the National Summer School of Spain in July which was attended by believers from Spain, Germany, France, and Morocco. More than one parent/child conference was sponsored by the Baháʼís of Morocco to mark the International Year of the Child. At the discussions on the draft of the Declaration on the Elimination of All Forms of Intolerance and of Discrimination Based on Religion or Belief at the Social, Cultural and Humanitarian Affairs Committee of the United Nations General Assembly there were several mentions of situation of the Baháʼís in Iran—the Moroccan delegate made reference to "religious fanaticism" in a statement which also provoked a reply from Iran. Manuchihi Hizari, one of the first Baháʼís in Morocco, left with his family in 1982 for the United States where he died in 2010. However persecutions occurred again in Morocco in 1983. All Baháʼí meetings were prohibited. Published polemics in the 1970s and 1980s continued. In June 1984 a Baháʼí in Tetuan is arrested and sentenced to three years in prison for violating the ban on meetings. A response to these developments was to seek diplomatic redress emphasizing the non-partisan and obedience to government principles of the religion.

Baháʼís have more recently been denied passports and can practice their religion only in private.

== Modern community ==
The events of 1962–3 are still considered a note on Moroccan politics. The 50th anniversary of the religion in Cameroon attracted some 560 Baháʼís including visitors from a host of countries including Morocco in 2003. Moroccan Baháʼís have managed to obtain acceptable national ID cards, avoiding the Egyptian identification card controversy. The religion is still considered heretical or some kind of "non-religion religion" according to Ayyad Ablal, a Moroccan sociologist.

=== Demographics ===
1992 estimates by the US Department of State counted some 150-200 Baháʼís while 2001 through 2009 estimates mention the Baháʼí community, mostly in Rabat and Casablanca, at 350 to 400 persons. However Association of Religion Data Archives (ARDA) estimated 30,000 Baháʼís in 2005 and 2010, which would make the Baháʼí Faith the third-largest religion in the country. The ARDA quotes census figures of 350 to 400 Baháʼí adherents and in 2015 changed their own estimate to 350–400 Baháʼís.

== See also ==
- Religion in Morocco (Islam in Morocco, Christianity in Morocco, History of the Jews in Morocco)
- History of Morocco
- Persecution of Baháʼís
