= Freedom of religion in Morocco =

Freedom of religion in Morocco refers to the extent to which people in Morocco are freely able to practice their religious beliefs, taking into account both government policies and societal attitudes toward religious groups. The constitution declares that Islam is the religion of the state, with the state guaranteeing freedom of thought, expression, and assembly. The state religion of Morocco is Islam. The government plays an active role in determining and policing religious practice for Muslims, and disrespecting Islam in public can carry punishments in the forms of fines and imprisonment.

Sunni Islam and Judaism are the only religions recognized by the Moroccan constitution as native to the country, with all other religions being considered "foreign". While foreigners can generally practice their religion in peace, citizens who practice "foreign religions" face obstacles from the government and social pressure. In particular, Shia Muslims and members of the Baháʼí Faith face discrimination from the government, as do some Christian groups. In 2022 there were no Shia mosques in the country.

Historically, Morocco has oscillated between periods of religious tolerance and intolerance. From the Muslim conquest of the Maghreb in 698 through the reign Almoravid dynasty in the 11th and 12th centuries, the region experienced a period of significant religious tolerance; Jews and Christians were required to pay special taxes, but otherwise were allowed to practice their religions in peace, allowing for the flourishing of a Jewish Golden Age. The following Almohad Caliphate instituted harsh religious rule, and forced all non-Muslims to convert on pain of death. Later dynasties reinstated policies of religious tolerance, allowing Jews and Christians to return to the country, although these later dynasties were also sometimes marked by the persecution of religious minorities, either by the government or by violent mobs. During World War II, Morocco fell under the Nazi-backed Vichy Regime, which attempted to deport the Jewish population to concentration camps. This attempt was blocked by Mohammed V of Morocco, although other anti-Jewish laws were successfully passed. Following independence in 1956, Morocco established a constitution which re-established Islam as a state religion, and nominally provides for the freedom of religion, although as mentioned above, discrimination against certain minority groups continues to the present day.

== Demographics ==
According to US Government estimates in 2022, more than 99 percent of the population was Sunni Muslim. Other groups making up the remaining 1 percent of the population include Christians, Jews, Shia Muslims, and Baháʼís.

According to Jewish community leaders in 2019, there are an estimated 3,000 to 3,500 Jews, approximately 2,500 of whom reside in Casablanca. The Rabat and Marrakech Jewish communities each have approximately 75 members.

Shia Muslim leaders estimate there are tens of thousands of Shia citizens, with the largest proportion in the north. In addition, there are an estimated 1,000 to 2,000 foreign-resident Shia from Lebanon, Syria, and Iraq. Leaders of the Ahmadi Muslim community estimate their numbers at 700 while leaders of the Baháʼí community estimate there are 350–400 members throughout the country.

Christian leaders estimate there are between 2,000 and 6,000 Christian citizens distributed throughout the country, although some leaders state there may be as many as 38,000. Foreign-resident Christian leaders estimate the foreign-resident Christian population numbers at least 30,000 Roman Catholics and 10,000 Protestants, many of whom are lifelong residents of the country whose families have resided and worked there for generations but do not hold Moroccan citizenship. There is a small foreign-resident Russian Orthodox community in Rabat and a small foreign-resident Greek Orthodox community in Casablanca. Most foreign-resident Christians live in the Casablanca, Tangier, and Rabat urban areas, but small numbers of foreign Christians are present throughout the country. Many are migrants from sub-Saharan Africa.

According to BBC Arabic, as of 2019 15% of the population identifies as nonreligious, an increase of 10% over 2013. According to Arab Barometer, 38% of citizens self-identified as "religious", 44% as "somewhat religious", and 13% as "not religious", with younger age cohorts displaying significantly lower levels of religiosity.

== History ==
=== Early Islamic Morocco (698–1060) ===
Following the invasion of the Maghreb in 698 c.e., the Muslim states controlling territories that roughly correspond to present day Morocco had relatively tolerant attitudes toward their Christian and Jewish subjects, who were considered "people of the book", although they were required to pay a special religious tax known as jizya. Berbers who did not profess Abrahamic religions, however, were forced to convert to Islam. Following the Berber Revolt, the Moroccan region was divided into several Berber states, some of which maintained Islam as a state religion, while others founded syncretic religions which mixed elements of Islamic, polytheistic, and Jewish religious practice.

While Christianity would largely disappear from the region over the following century, this has been attributed to a combination of social and economic pressure, as well as the waning prestige and influence of the Christian Church in the region, rather than to persecution. Meanwhile, the Jewish community expanded, particularly in the then-new city of Fez (founded in 789), and experienced a golden age, which would last until roughly the 11th century. In 1033 as part of a broader military conflict, there was a massacre of Jews in Fez by invaders of the Banu Ifran tribe, with thousands killed and many sold into slavery. The rule of the early Muslim dynasties in al-Andalus and the Maghreb comprised what is referred to as a golden age of Jewish culture, which would continue until the rise of the Almohad Caliphate.

=== Berber dynasties (1060–1549) ===
==== Almoravid dynasty (1060–1147) ====
The Almoravid dynasty which came to power in the 11th century imposed stricter interpretations of Islamic law on its territories, comprising the western parts of modern Morocco, as well as the southern half of Iberia. While their rule was mostly free of major abuses against religious minorities, social hostility against them increased. Additionally, some explicitly anti-Jewish laws were enacted, such as a ban preventing Jews from living in the new Almoravid capital of Marrakesh.

==== Almohad Caliphate (1147–1248) ====
The Almohad Caliphate represented a significant departure from prior religious policy, both in terms of Islamic law and the treatment of religious minorities. In matters of law, the Zahiri and Ashʿari schools were given preference, and the caliphs of the Almohad Caliphate were hostile to the Maliki school, which had been preferred by the Almoravids. In the 12th century, laws were passed banning all non-Zahirite religious texts; by the end of the century, such books were ordered to be burned.

The Almohads abolished the practice of preferential treatment for "people of the book", ending the practice of jizya, which was replaced by a policy of forced conversion. Following a seventh month grace period, most of the Jews and Christians in Morocco were forced to convert to Islam on pain of death, or fled the country. Many cases of Jews and Christians choosing to die as martyrs were recorded. Converts were further treated with suspicion, and were forced to wear identifying clothing.

==== Marinid and Wattasid dynasties (1248–1549) ====
The Marinid dynasty which followed the Almohad Caliphate represented a return to previous policies of religious tolerance. Members of minority religions, particularly Jews, were appointed to high-ranking official posts in Morocco during this period. The end of the dynasty's rule, however, was punctuated by the 1465 Moroccan revolt, during which almost the entire Jewish community of Fez was killed. During the reign of the Wattasid dynasty which followed, the Jewish population recovered significantly, as refugees fleeing the Spanish and Portuguese Inquisition settled in Morocco.

=== Arab dynasties (1549–1830) ===
==== Saadi dynasty (1549–1659) ====
The Saadi dynasty reimposed heavy taxes against non-Muslims, but also continued to appoint non-Muslims to positions of authority in Morocco. Local rulers, as well as general Arab society, were not always as tolerant, at times subjecting non-Muslims to harsh humiliations.

==== Independent Alaouite Morocco (1666–1880) ====
Many of the sultans of the Alaouite dynasty appointed non-Muslims to positions of power, although as a consequence of various power struggles and succession crises, non-Muslims who were awarded with high appointments by one sultan were sometimes later singled out for punishment by his successor. The position of town consul in Morocco was held almost exclusively by Jewish merchants until 1875. Towards the end of this era, European powers extended "protection" to Jewish communities in Morocco, and then used this as a pretext to interfere in Moroccan politics. During the Spanish-Moroccan War of 1859, Jewish communities in Morocco were subject to pogroms.

In 1864, Muhammad IV passed a royal decree granting equal rights to Jews. This decree, however, was largely ignored by local authorities. The following sultan, Hassan I, continued his predecessors' policies of tolerance.

=== European dominion (1912–1956) ===
As the 19th century drew to a close, Morocco fell further under the control of European powers, particularly France and Spain. Following the Agadir Crisis, Morocco was divided into French and Spanish protectorates, which officially recognized Roman Catholicism, Judaism, and Islam as the three religions of Morocco. During this period, intellectuals in the nascent Moroccan nationalist movement tended to advocate for a secular state, favoring the separation of church and state and opposing the influence of religious authorities. The popularity of these tendencies could be attributed first to French republican ideals such as laïcité, and later to the influence of Marxism in Moroccan nationalist politics.

During World War II, Morocco was controlled by Vichy France, which attempted to deport Jews to concentration camps as part of the Holocaust. This order was blocked by Mohammed V, technically still the sultan of Morocco under the French protectorate. However, some Nazi race laws were still implemented despite Mohammed's protests, and he was forced to sign certain laws barring Jews from certain schools and government positions.

=== Independence (1956–present) ===
==== Mohammed V (1956–1961) ====
Mohammed V would become the first king of independent Morocco following negotiations with France, establishing the country as a constitutional monarchy. A constitution was drafted during his reign, although it would not be ratified until 1962, after his death. This constitution re-established Islam as the state religion of Morocco, while also according Judaism a privileged status as an integral part of Moroccan society and nominally granting the freedom of religion to people in Morocco.

==== Hassan II (1961–1999) ====
Following the establishment of an independent Moroccan state by his father, Hassan II presided over a repressive regime known as the Years of Lead. While these decades were primarily known for their political repression, during the 1960s the Baháʼí Faith community in Morocco faced sharp persecution, with several Baháʼí sentenced to prison or executed for their faith.

==== Mohammed VI (1999–present) ====
Mohammed VI has generally been described as more liberal than his predecessor, and has enacted reforms to improve the country's human rights record. Among these is the introduction of civil law concerning divorce (as opposed to religious law). Following the 2003 Casablanca bombings, Morocco engaged in a crackdown against Islamic extremists, arresting thousands, prosecuting 1,200, and sentencing around 900. Religious minorities not specially recognized by the government, such as Christians and Baháʼís, continue to face obstacles to religious practice. In 2016, a new press code was implemented, removing jail time as a potential punishment for insulting Islam (along with several other types of speech not related to religion), although these acts remain punishable by fines. This change is a reform of a press law implemented in 2002, also during the reign of Mohammed VI. This press code, however, was undermined by further changes to the penal code, which effectively reinstated prison sentences for the charges.

== Legal framework ==
The constitution of Morocco establishes that Islam is the state religion of Morocco, and also grants freedom of thought, expression, assembly, and the right for everyone to "practice their religious affairs". The constitution also specifically recognizes the Jewish community in Morocco as an integral component of Moroccan society. The Protestant and Catholic Churches, whose existence as foreign-resident churches predates the country's independence in 1956, maintain a special status recognized by the government since independence.

According to the constitution, only the High Council of Ulema, a group headed and appointed by the king with representatives from all regions of the country, is authorized to issue fatwas, which become legally binding only through endorsement by the king in a royal decree and subsequent confirmation by parliamentary legislation. If the king or parliament decline to ratify a decision of the Ulema, the decision remains nonbinding and unenforced.

=== Ministry of Endowments and Islamic Affairs ===
Morocco's Ministry of Endowments and Islamic Affairs oversees the content of sermons in mosques, Islamic religious education, and the dissemination of Islamic religious material by the broadcast media, actions it says are intended to combat violent extremism. The government restricts the distribution of non-Islamic religious materials, as well as Islamic materials it deemed inconsistent with the Maliki-Ashʿari school of Sunni Islam.

Religious organizations for faiths other than Sunni Islam and Judaism are required to register with the government as associations in order to operate and own land. Shia Muslim groups are prevented from registering, and Baháʼí Faith and Christian groups have forgone registration due to the belief that they would not be approved.

=== Personal status courts ===
A separate set of laws and special courts govern personal status matters for Jews, including functions such as marriage, inheritance, and other personal status matters. Rabbinical authorities administer Jewish family courts. Muslim judges trained in the country's Maliki-Ashʿari Sunni interpretation of the relevant aspects of sharia administer the courts for personal status matters for all other religious groups. According to the law, a Muslim man may marry a Christian or Jewish woman; a Muslim woman may not marry a man of another religion unless he converts to Islam. Non-Muslims must formally convert to Islam and be permanent residents before they can become guardians of abandoned or orphaned children. Guardianship entails the caretaking of a child, which may last until the child reaches 18, but does not allow changing the child's name or inheritance rights, and requires maintaining the child's birth religion, according to orphanage directors.

=== Restrictions ===
The criminal code prohibits proselytization to Muslims, punishable by fines of 200 to 500 Moroccan dirham ($21 to US$53) and 6 months to 3 years of prison. Foreigners may instead be expelled from the country. It is not, however, illegal for Muslims to convert voluntarily. It is illegal to criticize Islam on public platforms, punishable by fines of up to 200,000 dirham (~US$21,000) and up to two years of prison. Impeding people from worship is also illegal, punishable by fines and imprisonment. Muslims who break their fast in public without a religious exception during Ramadan can also be fined and imprisoned.

A limited number of Arabic translations of the Bible were available for sale in a few bookshops for use in university religion courses. Authorities confiscated Bibles they believed were intended for use in proselytizing.

In January 2017, the Ministry of the Interior banned the sale, manufacture, and import of burqas but did not make it illegal to wear them (an exception is required for police and armyofficers and some news-readers).

== Treatment of "foreign" religious groups by the government ==
According to human rights organizations and local Christian leaders, the government has detained and questioned some Christian citizens about their beliefs and contacts with other Christians. Christian and Shia Muslim citizens stated fears of government harassment led to their decision to hold religious meetings in members’ homes. Christian citizens are not allowed to establish churches. In a 2023 report by Open Doors UK, Morocco was ranked as one of the 30 countries in the world where it is most dangerous to be a Christian.

Foreign clergy said they discouraged the country's Christian citizens from attending their churches out of fear they could be criminally charged with proselytism. Some Christian citizens reported authorities pressured Christian converts to renounce their faith. On several occasions, the government has expelled foreign individuals accused of proselytism as “a threat to public order,” rather than prosecuting them under provisions of the law that prohibit “undermining the faith.”

Some Christian citizens have reported authorities pressured Christian converts to renounce their faith by informing the converts’ friends, relatives, and employers of the individuals’ conversion, although there were no reported instances of this practice in 2019. Christian citizens are not allowed to establish churches. Christian citizens stated authorities made phone or house calls several times a year to demonstrate they had lists of members of Christian networks and monitored Christian activities. Foreigners attended religious services without restriction at places of worship belonging to officially recognized churches.

Some religious minority groups, such as the Baháʼí community, practiced their religion without formal registration. In October 2017 media reported that authorities prevented the Baháʼí community from publicly celebrating the bicentennial of the birth of the faith's founder.

== Education ==
By law, all publicly funded educational institutions must teach Sunni Islam in accordance with the teachings and traditions of the Maliki-Ashari school of Islamic jurisprudence. Foreign-run and privately funded schools have the choice of teaching Islamic or of not including religious instruction within the school's curriculum. Private Jewish schools are able to teach Judaism.

The constitution also establishes that public television stations must dedicate five percent of their programming to Islamic religious content, and that they must broadcast the calls to prayer five times a day.

Muslim citizens often study at private Christian and private Jewish schools, reportedly primarily because these schools maintained a reputation for offering superior education. According to school administrators, Muslim students constitute a significant portion of the students at Jewish schools in Casablanca.

== Societal attitudes ==
Some Christian, Baháʼí, and Shia Muslims report societal, familial, and cultural pressure on account of their faith. Citizens have been arrested during Ramadan for eating in public during fasting hours.

Members of the Baháʼí Faith are generally open about their faith with family, friends, and neighbors, but feared extremist elements in society would try to do them harm, leading them to ask local police for protection at their gatherings.

Shia Muslims report that in some areas, particularly in large cities in the north, they did not hide their faith from family, friends, or neighbors, but that many avoided disclosing their religious affiliation in areas where their numbers were smaller.

Jewish citizens report that they live and attend services at synagogues in safety. They said they were able to visit religious sites regularly and to hold annual commemorations.

In the past, women who wear hijabs have had difficulty finding employment in the private sector and with the army and police. When they did obtain employment, women report employers either encouraged or required them to remove their headscarves during working hours.

== See also ==
- Religion in Morocco
- Islam in Morocco
- Christianity in Morocco
- Catholic Church in Morocco
- Protestantism in Morocco
