= Protestantism in Morocco =

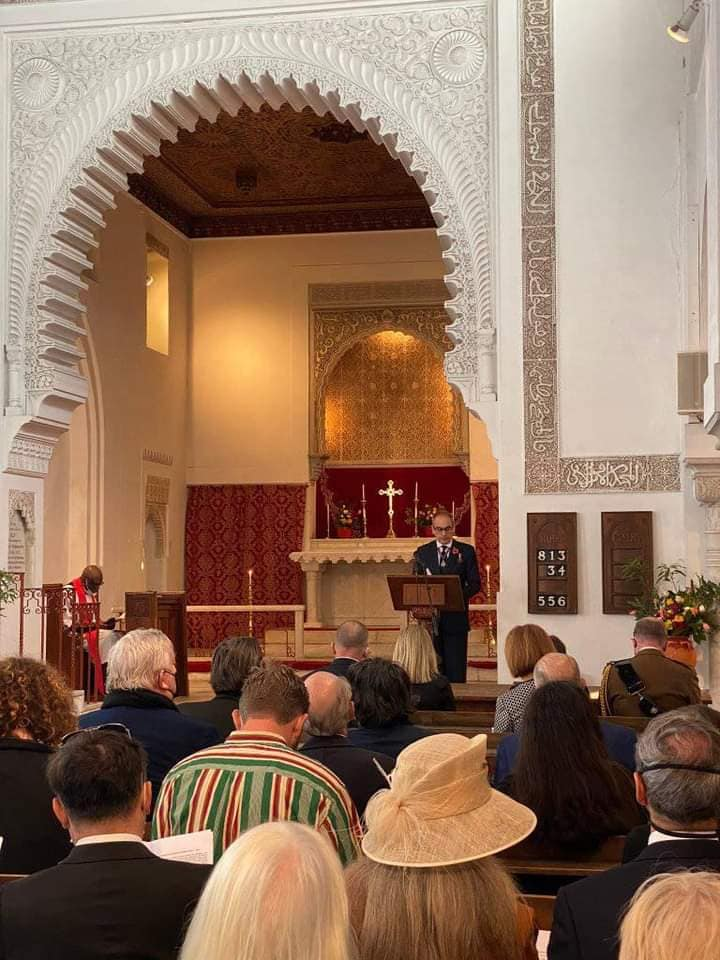
Moroccan Protestants from Tangier

Christians in Morocco constitute less than 1% of the country's population of 33,600,000. Approximately one third of Christians in the country are Protestants. It is estimated that there are about 10,000 Protestants in the country, most of them from sub-Saharan Africa. Other estimates place the number at approximately 3,000. The largest Protestant denomination in the country is the Evangelical Church of Morocco (Eglise Evangélique au Maroc), which has links to the Reformed Church of France.

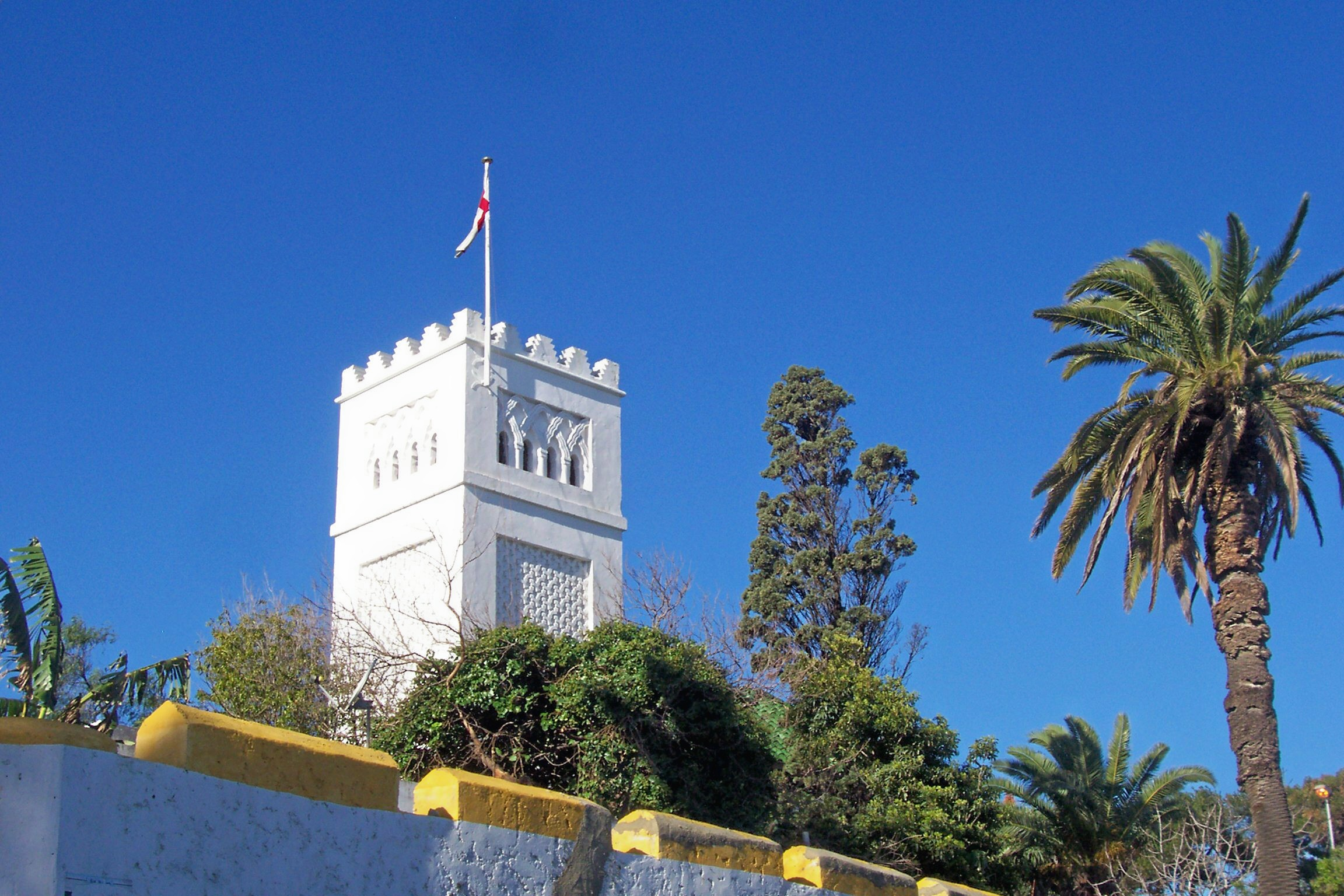
Church of Saint Andrew, Tangier

While most areas of Africa (including eastern North Africa) have independent Anglican dioceses and provinces, the western part of North Africa, including the Anglican Church of Morocco, is part of the Diocese of Europe, which is itself part of the Province of Canterbury in the Church of England. There are two permanent chaplaincies, one in Casablanca and one in Tangier. Small groups of Anglicans have worshipped together in Marrakesh, but there is no Anglican Church established here.

The Anglican Church of Saint Andrew, Tangier has become a tourist attraction, partly due to certain well-known figures buried in its churchyard. The church is an early twentieth-century replacement for an earlier smaller building, which was built with the express permission of the King of Morocco, on land donated by him.

The Anglican Church of Saint John the Evangelist, Casablanca, is centrally located, near to the Hyatt Regency hotel in the city centre. It has a well-established congregation, and holds two services every Sunday morning to accommodate all worshippers. There is a catechetical programme for children.

On 27 March 2010, the Moroccan magazine TelQuel stated that thousands of Moroccans had converted to Christianity. Pointing out the absence of official data, Service de presse Common Ground, cites unspecified sources that stated that about 5,000 Moroccans became Christians between 2005 and 2010.

In 2014, the Evangelical Church worked with the Catholic Church to open Al Mowafaqa Ecumenical Institute of Theology in Rabat, a teaching centre for priests and pastors throughout Africa, Europe and North America. The Institute is supervised by the Protestant Theology Faculty of Strasbourg and the Catholic Institute of Paris.

The Protestant denominations in Morocco include;

- Independent International (CIPC / TTC / MMC / RIC)
- Assemblées de Dieu
- Eglise Evangélique au Maroc
- Eglise Emmanuele
- Fréres Larges
- Mission du Monde Arabe
- Seventh-day Adventist Church
- Union Evangélique Missionaire

Patricia St. John was a Protestant missionary nurse in Morocco in the post-World War II years.

== History ==
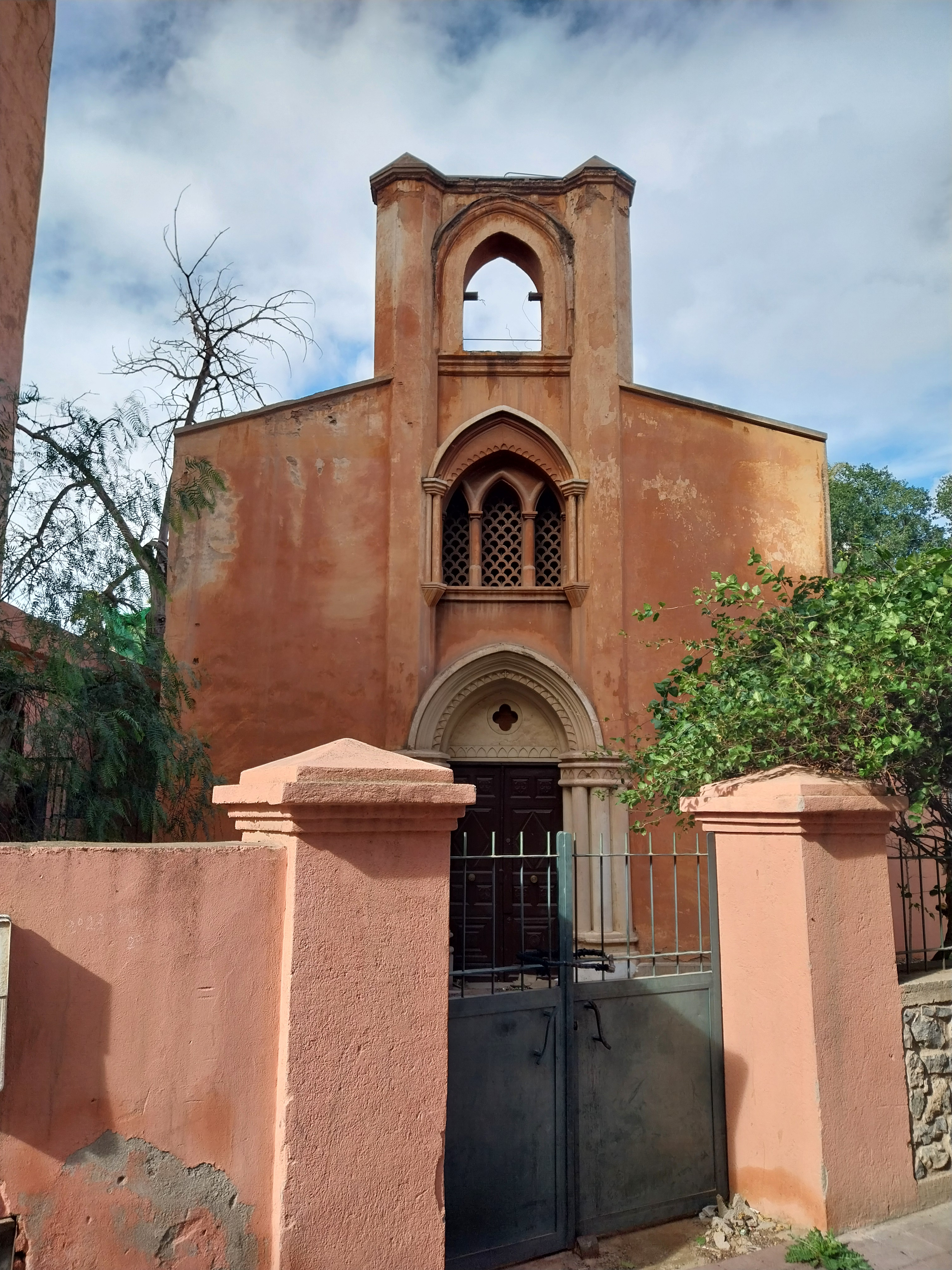
Former protestant chapel in Guéliz, Marrakesh

Many historical writings indicate that Arabs were aware of the presence of a new Lutheran religion within Europe throughout the 16th Century, despite their lack of practice. Ahmad al-Mansur maintained diplomatic relations with these new Lutheran countries in the midst of his own war against Catholic enemies in Portugal and Spain. There had already been a bishopric established in Morocco in the 13th Century, but this was a Catholic institution, and Protestantism had not yet been introduced.

During the colonial period in Morocco, while there weren't many converts to Protestantism, there were many expatriates from France living within the country. These expatriates established churches and orders of their own, with missionaries to help them maintain. The first Protestant church in established in Casablanca was St John’s Anglican Church in 1906. After Moroccan Independence in 1956, the sultan had much drawback towards these Churches and establishments, and this would continue throughout the 20th century into the 21st.

== See also ==
- Religion in Morocco
- Christianity in Morocco
- Catholic Church in Morocco
- Freedom of religion in Morocco
- Al Mowafaqa Ecumenical Institute of Theology
