= Catholic Church in Morocco =

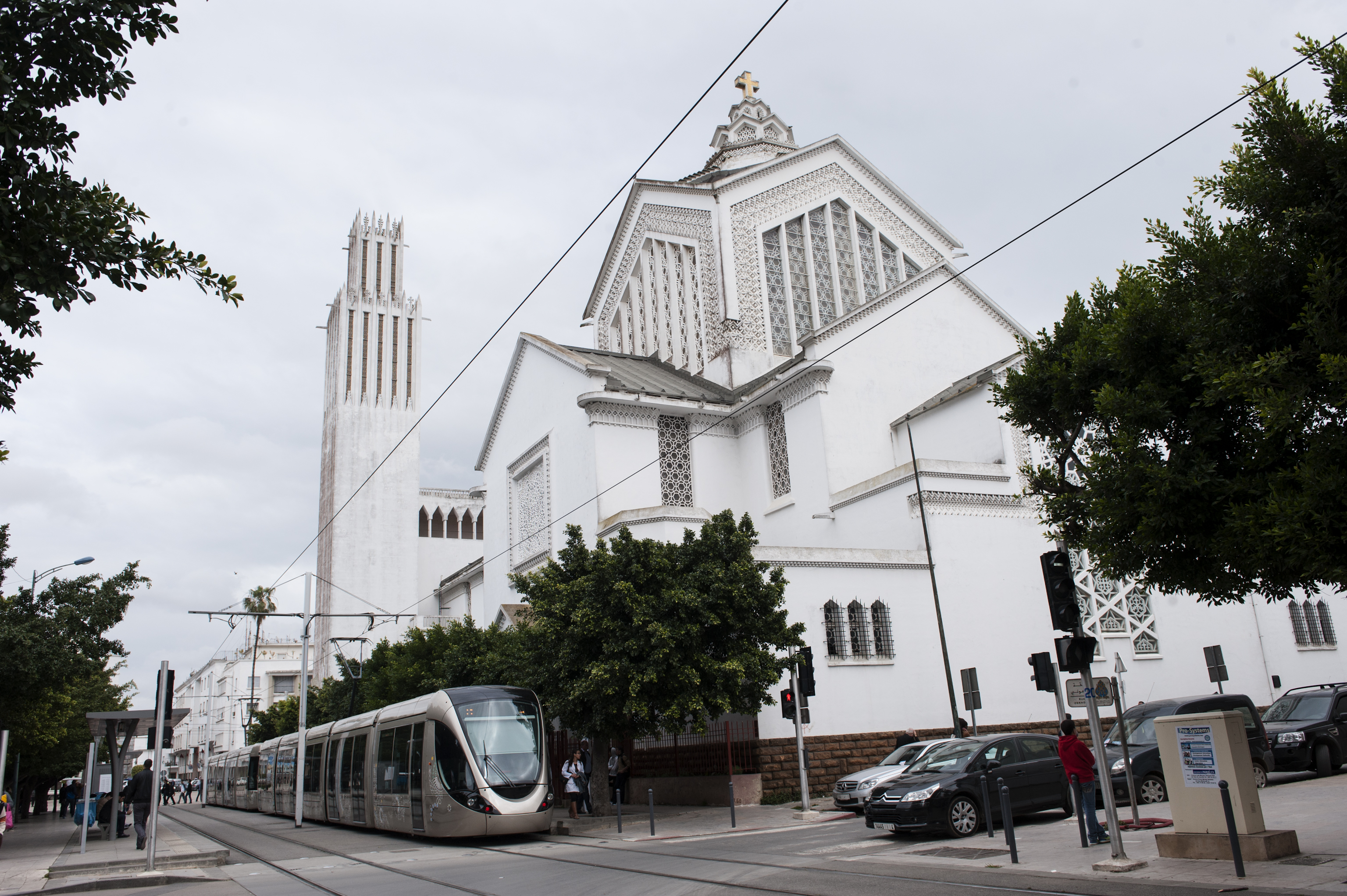
- St. Peter's Cathedral, Rabat
- Type: National polity
- Classification: Catholic Church
- Orientation: Latin Church
- Pope: Leo XIV
- Apostolic Nuncio: Alfred Xuereb
- Region: Morocco
- Members: c. 25,000
- Primary schools: 16

The Catholic Church in Morocco is part of the worldwide Catholic Church (particularly the Latin Church), under the spiritual leadership of the Pope in Rome. Catholics account less than 1% of the overall population of over 31 million. The country is divided into two archdioceses, Rabat and Tangier. As of 2024, 44 churches operate under the auspices of the Catholic Church, served by 57 clergy representing 15 nationalities.

Christianity, originally introduced in the region in the 2nd century AD, decreased after the Muslim conquest of the Maghreb in the 7th century. During the 12th and 13th century Christians newcomers, coming as captives, mercenaries or merchants, revived Christianity with the aid of missions by the Franciscans and papal support. These missions, continuing into the 18th century, focused primarily on providing pastoral care to the local Christians though occasionally they also sought to proselytise Muslims. At times, Catholics were persecuted by the local government or local population.

When the Spanish and French divided Morocco into respective protectorates, the conditions of the Catholic Church flourished due to an influx of around 470,000 Catholics. Catholic churches, schools, and hospitals were built throughout the country, and until 1961, Sunday mass festivities were broadcast on radio and television networks. After the independence, the Catholic population decreased significantly as many Catholics left to France or Spain. Since then, the Catholic Church continues to provide pastoral care to remaining Catholics and engages in interreligious dialogue.

== History ==
=== Early Christianity ===
Christianity was introduced to the region in the 2nd century AD, and gained converts in the towns and among slaves as well as among Berber farmers. By the end of the 4th century, the Romanized areas had been Christianized, and inroads had been made among the Berber tribes, who sometimes converted en masse. According to tradition, Marcellus of Tangier was martyred at Tingi (Tangier) during the Diocletianic Persecution in 298 after he declared he could no longer serve in the army and is today considered a saint by the Catholic Church.

=== Middle Ages ===
The disappearance of indigenous Christian communities in the Maghrib remains a mystery though scholars have begun to develop models to understand this better. It is typically assumed that Morocco's indigenous Christian population disappeared likely in the reign of the Almohad Caliphate during which also many Jews went into exile. Nevertheless, Christian communities persisted among the Berber tribes into the twelfth and thirteenth century when new groups of Christians came to Morocco which can be divided into three groups.

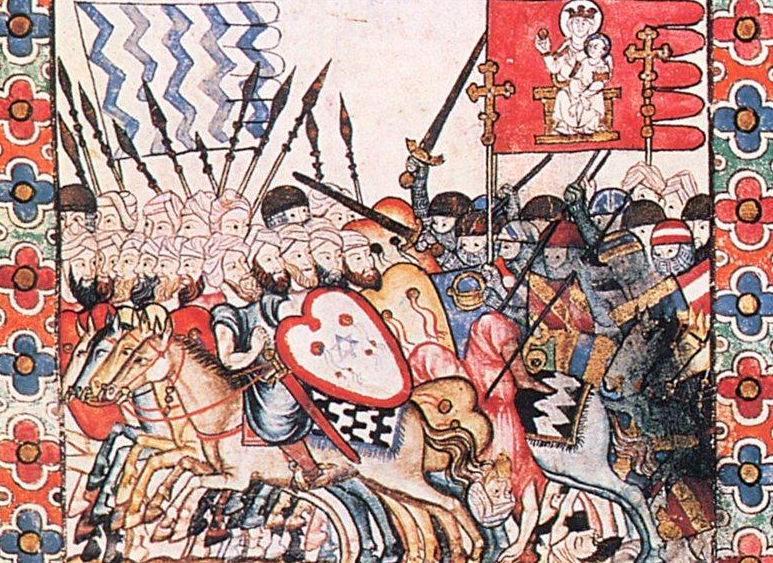
Detail of the Cantiga de Santa Maria: the successful 1261–62 defence of Marrakesh by Almohad ruler Al-Murtada (with help from Christian militias) against the Marinids

The first consisted of Christian captives, primarily those deported by the Almoravids in the first half of the twelfth century and including both Mozarabs from al-Andalus as well as Christians from the kingdoms of northern Iberia. These would often become slaves unless they converted to Islam or were ransomed by their families or by the Trinitarian and Mercedarian orders which were founded for that purpose in the late twelfth century. The second included Christian mercenaries and exiled Iberian nobles such as the Castilian count Fernando Núñez de Lara or Portuguese infante Pedro of Coimbra who crossed the strait of Gibraltar to offer their military services in North Africa, especially during the ascendancy of the Almohads in the Maghrib between 1147 and 1248. The third group were merchants from Catalonia, Provence and the Italian maritime republics that had secured commercial relations. Though there is no information on the size of these new communities, they seem to have been sizeable. Sources such as archbishop Rodrigo Jiménez report that a vicus (suburb or village) known as Ebora or Elbora existed outside of Marrakesh where an exclusive Christian population, called contemptuously beni Farkhan by Muslims, lived enclosed by sturdy walls and its own church. Even the puritanical Almohads tolerated these Christian groups due to the economical value of the trade and the military power they provided, though they prohibited proselytism.

A problem arose as these groups would need a priest to administer rites, but by that time no Latin clergy remained in Morocco. Though Christian nobles or merchants would bring a chaplain and the Trinitarians and Mercedarians would take care of the captives from the end of the twelfth century, the structure of the Church was disunited and while the captives were unfree, the mercenaries and merchants were often only periodically in the region and the spiritual care informal and undeveloped. The effort of the Trinitarians directed papal attention to the region and in 1192, Pope Celestine III sent a priest to Morocco. In 1198 pope Innocent III wrote a letter asking to Almohad caliph to allow the Trinitarians to carry out their work in the region and sent two Trinitarians with a considerable amount of funds to purchase the freedom of Christian captives (according to sources, 186 prisoners were freed). The most influential pope was Honorius III whose policy of protecting the existing Christian communities and winning converts among the Muslim population remained prominent in the papal curia into the 1250s. In his papal bull Vineae Domini custodes from 1225 he exhorted and gave permission to friars from both the newly founded Dominican and Franciscan order to go to Morocco and not only to take spiritual care of the Christians but also convert Muslims, a change from the position of his predecessors.

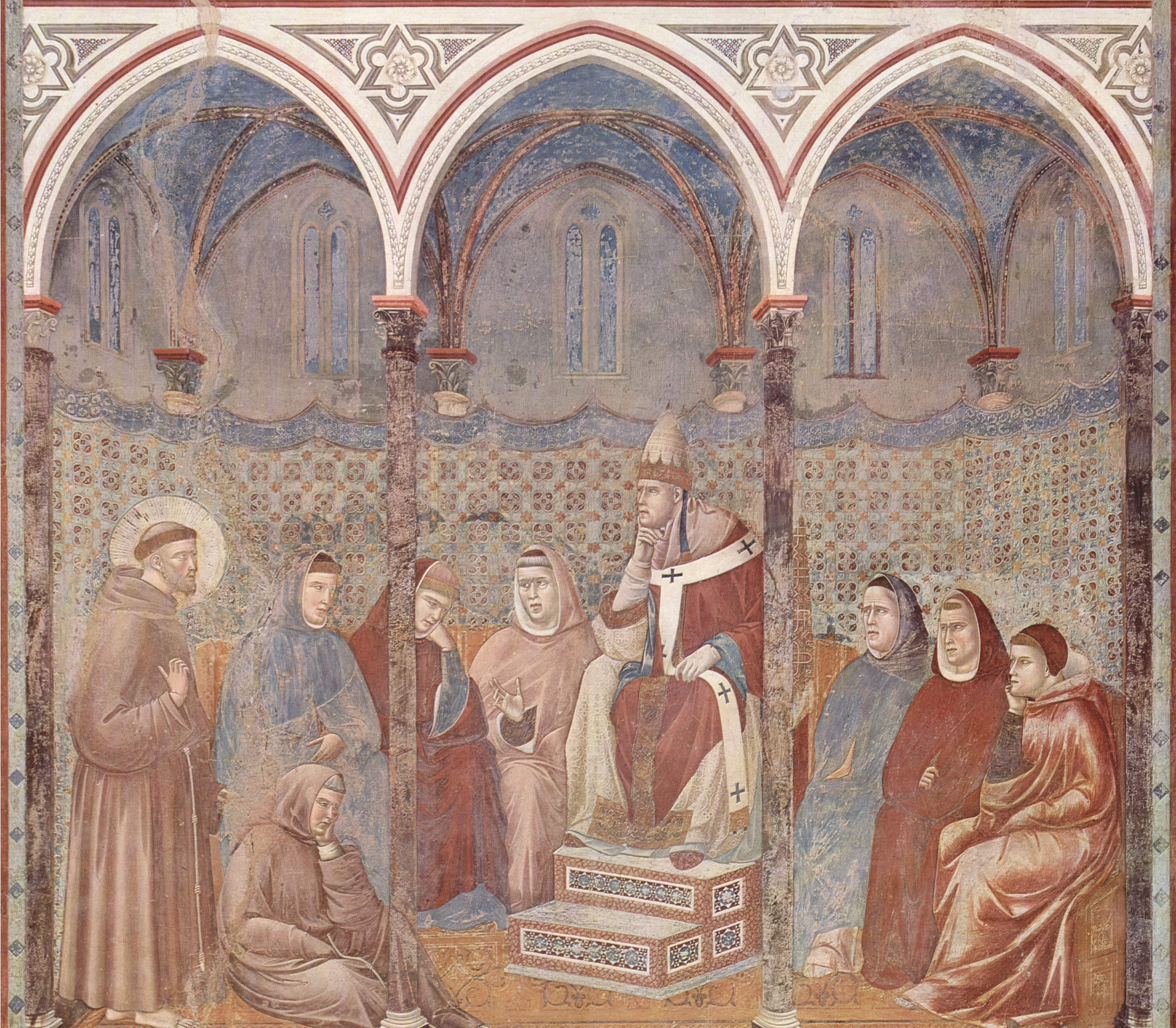
Saint Francis preaches in the presence of Honorius III: fresco by Giotto in the Basilica of Saint Francis of Assisi (c. 1296-98)

In this, he also followed the example of the Franciscans who had sent missionaries to Muslim countries after the Second General Chapter in 1219 on suggestion of Francis of Assisi. While Francis went to Egypt, five missionaries, among them the Arabic speaking Berard of Carbio, went via Spain and Portugal to Morocco. Here, they preached the Gospel but were imprisoned by the sultan as proselytism was contrary to Islamic law and later beheaded after rejecting conversion to Islam. These five missionaries were later canonized and their feast day is celebrated on January 16. A new mission took place in 1227 when, following the death of Francis of Assisi, six friars under the leadership of Daniel, Minister Provincial of Calabria, were sent upon their request on a new mission to Morocco. They too were imprisoned upon preaching and were beheaded when they refused to reject Christianity.

Additionally, Honorius III asked archbishop Rodrigo Jiménez to appoint one of the mendicant missionaries as new bishop of the newly constituted diocese of Morocco. During the dynastical struggle after the death of caliph Yusuf II in 1224, his eventual successor al-Maʾmun started to rely more heavily on the Christian support and also broke with traditional Almohad policy. He declared that Jesus was the Mahdi, thus renouncing the claim of Ibn Tumart, founder of the Almohad dynasty. Al-Maʾmun asked king Ferdinand III of Castile for support who sent in 1229 some 500 knights in return for the concession that the Christians were allowed to build a church in Ebora and permitted to sound its bells. Also, while they had been previously banned from entering Marrakesh, they were now allowed inside its walls during daytime. After al-Maʾmun died in 1232, his nephew and contender sacked Marrakesh and Ebora, massacring its Christian population including five Franciscan friars. Al-Maʾmun's son Abd al-Wahid II was able to restore the kingdom, again with the help of Christian soldiers, and by 1237 pope Gregory IX was rejoicing that the Moroccan Church was flourishing and a bishop of Fez is known to have existed since 1233.

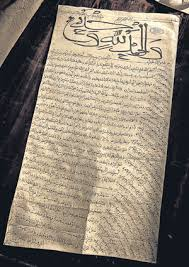
Letter from Abu Hafs Umar al-Murtada to Pope Innocent IV

However, by the late 1240s the tide had turned as the Almohad dynasty was losing control against the Marinids and a more traditionalist caliph, al-Murtada, was chosen who relied less on Christian troops and reasserted traditional doctrine of the Almohad caliphal authority. Though he again prohibited evangelisation, al-Murtada continued to rely on Christian mercenaries and allowed Catholic priests to take care of their spiritual needs. He also rejected the petition of pope Innocent IV to allow the Christians to live in fortified places which would allow them to be protected during the ongoing wars in Morocco.

After the end of the Almohad dynasty in 1269, the subsequent Hafsid and Marinid dynasties continued to employ Christian soldiers and the Christian communities continued. When Marinid emir Abu Yusuf Yaqub established New Fez in the 1270s, he set aside a quarter for his Christian mercenaries so that they lived apart from Muslims. Papal involvement became less, with exception of pope Nicholas IV, a former minister general of the Franciscans, who appointed a new bishop of Morocco in December 1289 and exhorted the Christian soldiers to act as Christian role models.

The Flemish priest Nicholas Clenardus, who lived in Fez from 1540 to 1541, wrote that he preferred living in the Jewish quarter rather than in the Christian funduq in the city as he felt safer there, especially as a priest.

The Catholic Cathedral See of Tangier was permitted to operate in English Tangier until the autumn of 1683, just before the English demolished and abandoned Tangier. Parish records from this period are preserved.

=== Franciscan missions ===
In the 17th century new Franciscan missions took place and though Juan de Prado died in 1631 as a martyr under sultan Al Walid ben Zidan, Walid's successor Mohammed es-Seghir gave the Franciscans permission to establish themselves in Morocco. The main focus of the mission was providing spiritual and pastoral care to Christian captives and the Christians living in Marrakesh. When on 2 June 1672 Moulay Ismail forced his nephew and competitor Ahmed Ben-Mahrez to flee and entered Marrakesh, he ordered the Franciscans to move their convent to Meknes, ostensibly for their protection. When they arrived on 2 July 1672, the friars settled among the Christian captives where they build a cabin which included a chapel, three cells and a refectory. The Christian captives, who were held in Meknes to construct buildings for Moulay Ismail as slaves, amounted to around 3,000. When Moulay Ismail decided to move them to the eastern quarter of the town, he also forced the Franciscans to move to another spot. This time the Franciscans were able to purchase three adjoining houses and installed a mission and hospital there which was inaugurated on 3 May 1693. After two years, the mission was granted the status of a convent and Father Diego de Los Angeles became superior with the right to vote in the chapter. Due to his good standing with Moulay Ismail, the latter issued a dahir in which he allowed the Franciscans to remain in the country with thirteen friars and to further establish churches in Fez, Tétouan and Salé. Under the protection of Moulay Ismail, the Franciscans cultivated amicable relations with notable Moroccans and offered their services and medical assistance to both Christian captives and poor Moroccans. Additionally, they also served as diplomatic intermediaries and helped to negotiate the return of Christian prisoners. While they received some assistance from the local population, they received funding primarily from Spanish donations and the Franciscan province of San Diego of Andalusia. The mission came to an end in the 18th century after an earthquake destroyed their church, convent and hospice in 1755 and the persecution of Christians by Moulay Yazid.

=== During the French and Spanish protectorate ===
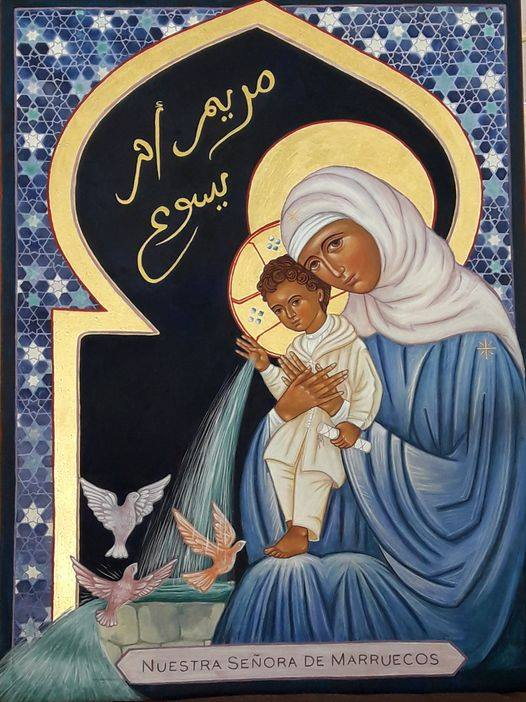
Icon of Our Lady of Morocco

Prior to independence, the numbers of the Catholics in French Morocco reached about 360,000 or about 4.1% of the population while in Casablanca European Christians formed almost half of the population. Catholics in French Morocco were mostly of French descent, and to a lesser extent of Spanish and Italian ancestry. Some Moroccans of Berber or Arab descent converted to Christianity during the French colonialism.

In 1950, Catholics in Spanish protectorate in Morocco and Tangier constitute 14.5% of the population, and Spanish Morocco was home to 113,000 Catholic settlers. Catholics in Spanish protectorate in Morocco and Tangier were mostly of Spanish descent, and to a lesser extent of Portuguese, French and Italian ancestry. In the years leading up to the First World War, European Christians formed almost a quarter the population of Tangier.

During Morocco's struggle for independence, the Catholic and Protestant churches stood in solidarity with the Moroccan people. Already prior to independence, Catholics such as Msgr Lefevre, bishop of Rabat, imagined the role of the Catholic church as one of presence and service to the Muslim population as opposed to solely focusing on the European settlers. These Catholic were influenced by the ideas of the Catholic mystic and desert explorer Charles de Foucauld who promoted respect for the Muslim religion, Christian-Muslim dialogue and living closely together with the Muslim population. Charles de Foucauld also inspired many Catholics to live among the Berber population as hermits or monastic communities such as Charles-André Poissonier who founded the monastery of Tazert or Albert Peyriguère who lived as hermit in El Kbab.

=== Post-independence ===
Since independence in 1956, the European population has decreased substantially, and many Catholics left to France or Spain. Independence prompted a mass exodus of the European Catholic settlers; after 1956 more than 75% of Catholic settlers left the country.

Upon invitation of archbishop Lefebvre, the monastery of Toumliline was founded in 1952 which became host for that International Meetings, conferences on contemporary issues and interfaith dialogue that were attended by Christian, Jewish and Muslim scholars. These came to an end when during the Years of Lead the monastery was forced to close down and the community had to leave. Nevertheless, the church continued Christian-Muslim dialogue, opening an interfaith research center in Rabat in 1980-81 and supporting the formation of the Groupe de Recherche Islamo-Chétien in 1977, which still exists today.

In 2020, there are approximately 25,000 Catholics in Morocco; this included 53 priests and 155 nuns. The two archdioceses consist of 35 parishes. Most Catholics were European expatriates, with a big majority of French and Spanish from colonization and post-independence. The second group is composed of Sub-Saharan immigrants, mainly students. During his visit to Morocco on March 31, 2019, Pope Francis openly acknowledged that there Catholics, including the Catholic church workers, are a minority in the country. There are several monastic orders active in the country, among them the Franciscan Missionaries of Mary and Trappists.

Though Christian proselytation is forbidden in Morocco, there are also converts from Islam, the dominant religion of the country. Those that convert from Sunnism to another religious belief, like Catholicism or Shiism, often keep their faith secret for fear of discrimination.

There are also between 3,000 and 10,000 Protestants in the country, most of them from sub-Saharan Africa.

== List of cathedrals and churches ==
=== Archdiocese of Rabat ===
The Archdiocese of Rabat is divided into 4 regions:

==== Region of Rabat ====
Rabat

- St. Peter's Cathedral
- Church of Saint Pius X
- Church of Saint Francis of Assisi
- Our Lady of Peace

==== Region of Casablanca ====
Church of Our Lady of Lourdes, Casablanca

Casablanca

- Church of Our Lady of Lourdes
- Church of Anfa-Maarif
- Church of Carmel Saint Joseph
- Church of Christ the King
- Church of Saint Francis of Assisi
- Sacré-Cœur Cathedral
- Church of Saint James

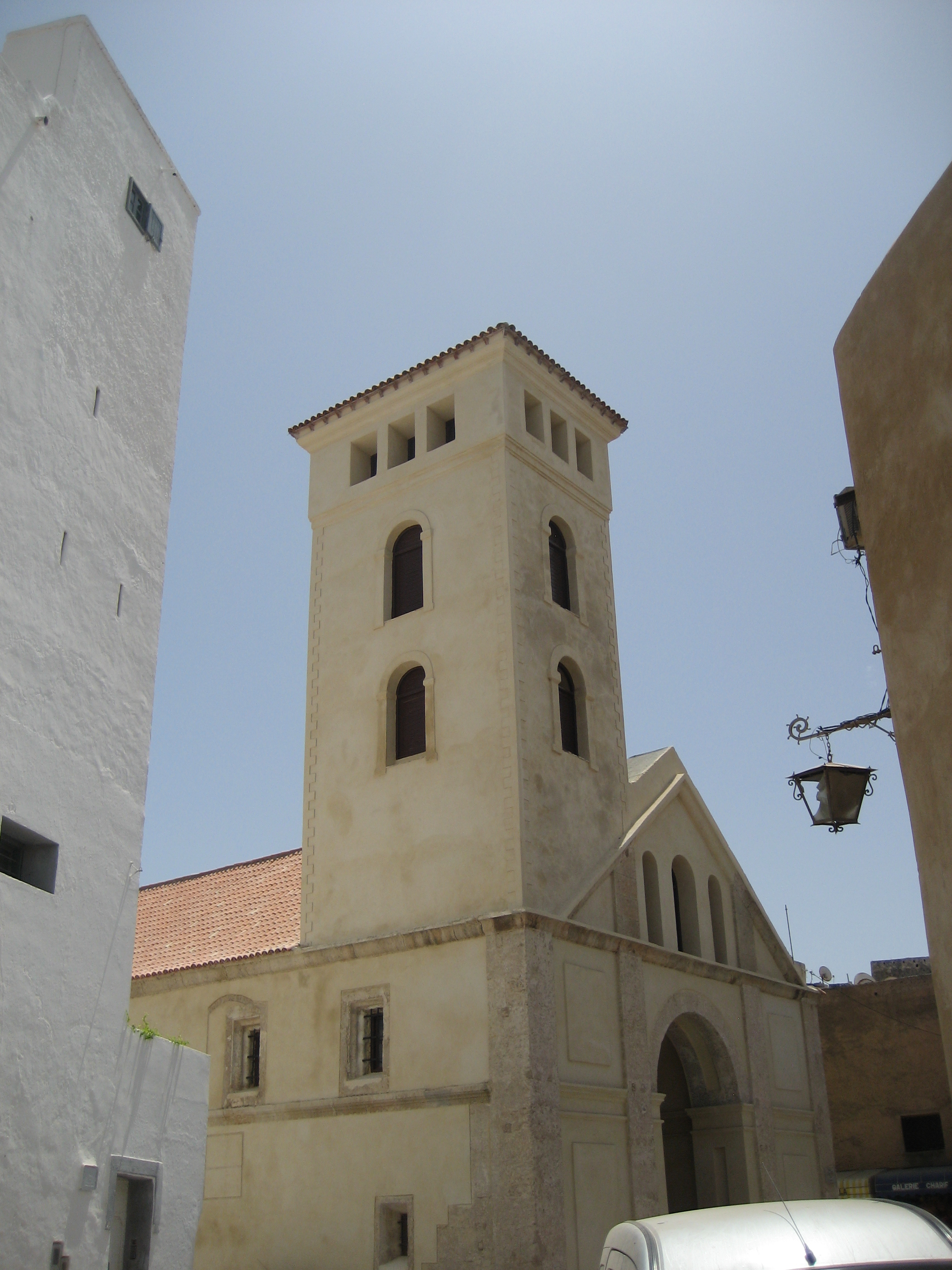
Former Catholic church, El Jadida

El Jadida

- Church of Saint Bernard

==== Region East ====
Fes

- Church of Saint Francis of Assisi

Meknes

- Notre Dame des Oliviers

Midelt

- Priory of Our Lady of Atlas

==== Region South ====
Agadir

- Church of Saint Anne

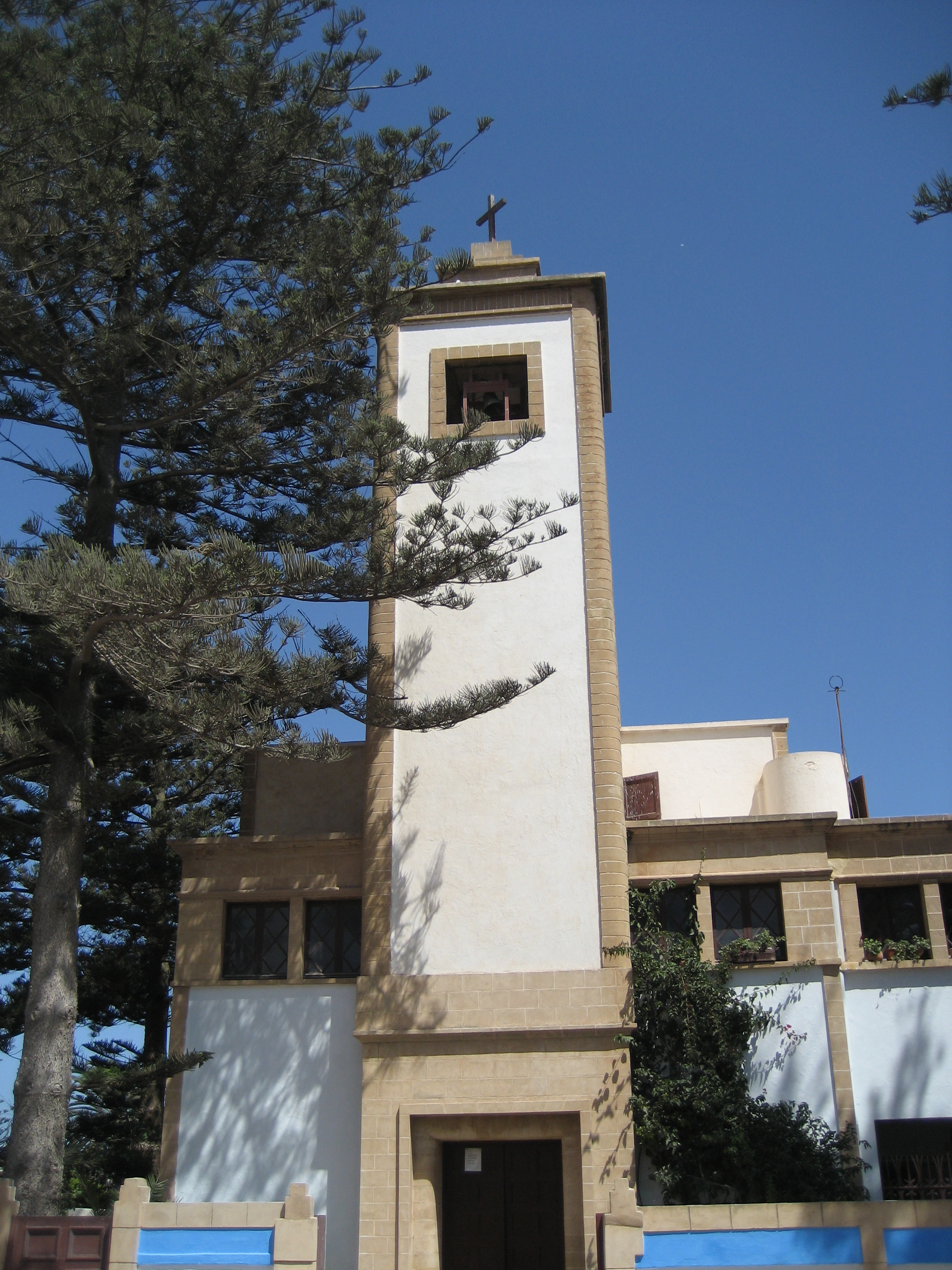
Our Lady of the Assumption, Essaouira

Essaouira

- Church of Our Lady of the Assumption

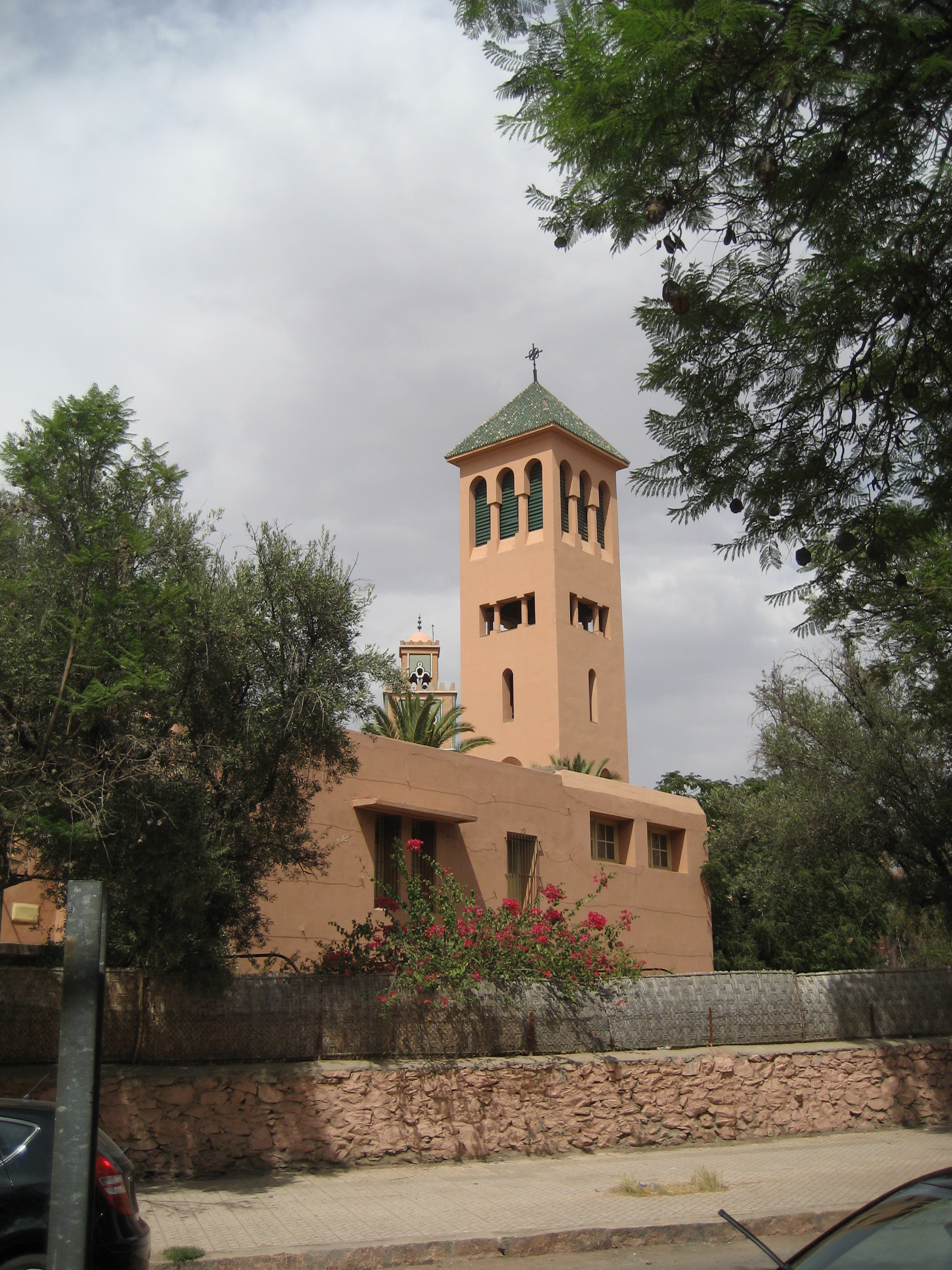
Church of the Holy Martyrs, Marrakesh

Marrakesh

- Church of the Holy Martyrs
- Monastery of Tazert

Ouarzazate

- Church of Saint Therese

=== Archdiocese of Tangier ===
Tangier

- Church of the Immaculate Conception
- French Church of Tangier
- Roman Catholic Cathedral of Tangier

Tetouan

- Church of Nuestra Señora de las Victorias

Asilah

- Church of San Bartolome

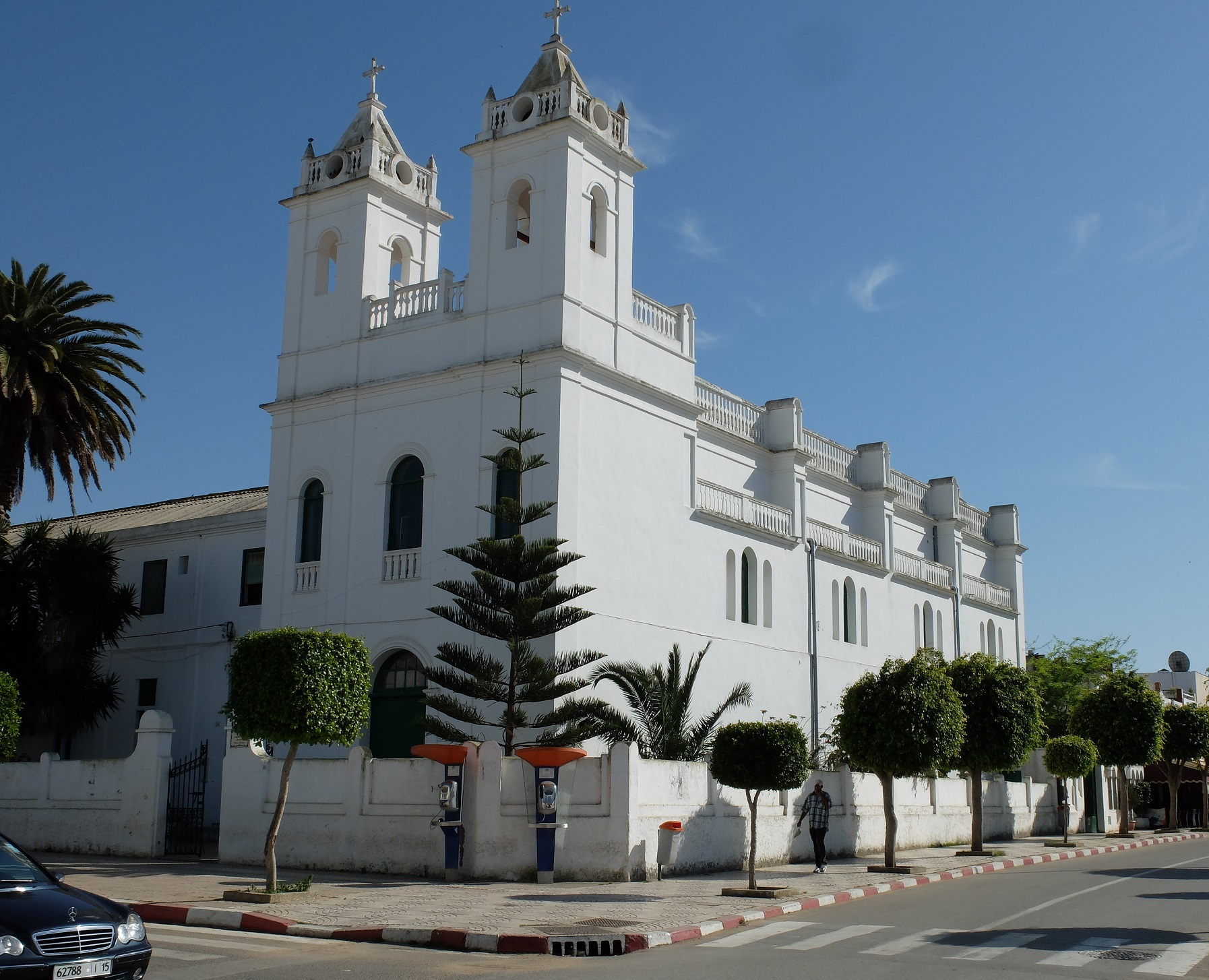
Church of Saint Bartholomew, Arzila

== Chronology of Catholic Dioceses ==
- 40-100 Toledo - Spain (Tamazgha, Morocco)
- 300-400 Toledo (Metr.) - Spain (Tamazgha, Morocco)
- 1226 Fez (established from Toledo)
- 1234 Marrakesh (in part continuation of the Fez diocese after the latter's suppression)
- 1469 Tangier / Tangier (detached from Ceuta, and from Marrakesh)
- 1487 Safi (detached from Marrakesh before 1487) - (Algarve behind the sea)
- 1542 Safim (incorporated in Tangier) - (Algarve behind the sea)
- 1566 Marrakesh (suppressed)
- 1570 Tangier (suppressed) - (Algarve behind the sea)
- 1630 Marocco / Marruecos (AP, See in Tangier) - (State of Fez, State of Morocco)
- 1908 Marocco / Marueccos (AV) - (Spanish Morocco, French Morocco)
- 1923 Rabat (AV, detached from Morocco) - (French Morocco)
- 1955 Rabat (AD)
- 1956 Tangier (AD, and new name, previously Marocco)

Reference Chronology of Catholic Dioceses: Morocco

== See also ==
- Religion in Morocco
- Christianity in Morocco
- Protestantism in Morocco
- Freedom of religion in Morocco
- List of cathedrals in Morocco

== Sources ==
- Barton, Simon (2005). "From Mercenary to Crusader: The Career of Álvar Pérez de Castro (d. 1239) Re-examined". In Harris, J.; Martin, T. (eds.). Church, State, Vellum and Stone: Essays on Medieval Spain in Honor of John Williams. Leiden: Brill Academic Press. pp. 111–129.
- Bicknell, Julia (9 November 2022). "'Spirit of Toumliline' Interfaith Inquiry Lives On 50 Years After Moroccan Monastery Closed". Religion Unplugged. Institute for Nonprofit News.
- Fonnesberg-Schmidt, Iben (2007). The Popes and the Baltic Crusades: 1147-1254. BRILL. ISBN 978-90-04-15502-2.
- Foster, Elizabeth A.; Greenberg, Udi (29 August 2023). Decolonization and the Remaking of Christianity. University of Pennsylvania Press. pp. 114–115. ISBN 978-1-5128-2497-1.
- Goudal, Anastase (1 January 1955). Histoire de la mission franciscaine à Meknès et origines du culte de la Vierge (in French). FeniXX réédition numérique. ISBN 978-2-402-19113-5.
- Lower, Michael (2014). "The Papacy and Christian Mercenaries of Thirteenth-Century North Africa". Speculum. 89 (3 JULY). The University of Chicago Press: 601–631. doi:10.1017/S0038713414000761. S2CID 154773840.
- Lower, Michael (20 October 2016). "Medieval European Mercenaries in North Africa". In France, John; DeVries, Kelly; Rogers, Clifford J. (eds.). Journal of Medieval Military History. Boydell & Brewer. ISBN 978-1-78327-130-6.
- Lupprian, Karl-Ernst (1981). Die Beziehungen der Päpste zu islamischen und mongolischen Herrschern im 13. Jahrhundert anhand ihres Briefwechsels (in German). Biblioteca apostolica vaticana. ISBN 978-88-210-0575-6.
- Nekrouf, Younès (1 January 1987). Une amitié orageuse : Moulay Ismaïl et Louis XIV (in French). FeniXX. ISBN 978-2-402-50699-1.
- O'Callaghan, Joseph F. (10 September 2013). Reconquest and Crusade in Medieval Spain. University of Pennsylvania Press. ISBN 978-0-8122-0306-6.
- "Monasticism: End Of An Adventure". Time. TIME USA, LLC. 23 May 1969.
