= Christianity in Morocco =

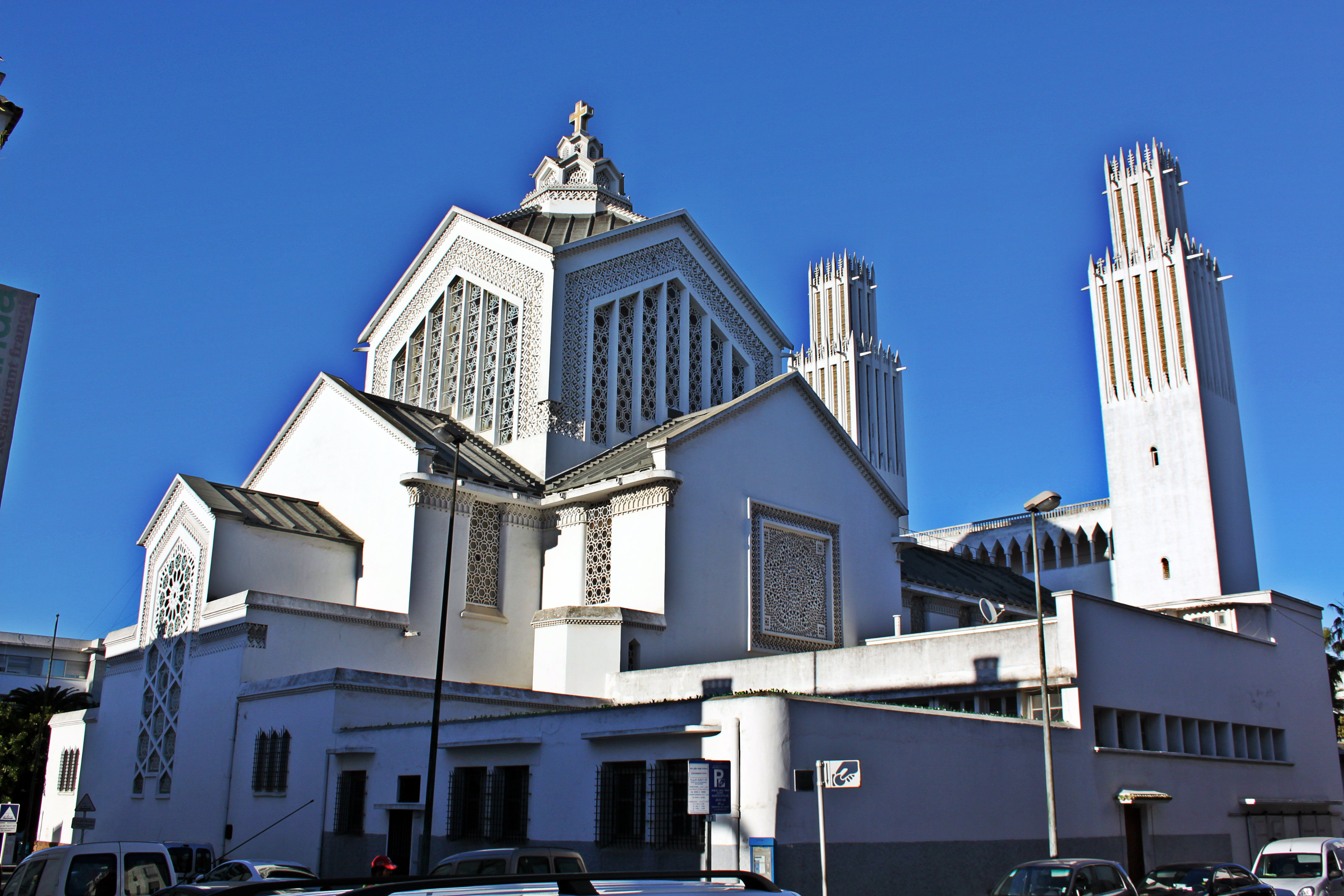
Cathedral of Rabat

Christians in Morocco constitute less than 1% of the country's population of 38,563,615 (2025 census). Most of the Christian adherents are Catholic and Protestants.

Christianity in Morocco appeared during the Roman times, when it was practiced by Christian Berbers in Roman Mauretania Tingitana, although it started to decline after the Islamic conquests in the 7th century. Indigenous Christianity in North Africa effectively continued after the Muslim conquest until the early 15th century.

During the French and Spanish protectorates, Morocco had significant populations of European Catholic settlers; on the eve of independence, an estimated 470,000 Catholics resided in Morocco. Since independence in 1956, the European Christian population has decreased substantially, and many Christians left to France or Spain. Prior to independence, the European Catholic settlers had historic legacy and powerful presence. Independence prompted a mass exodus of the European Christian settlers; after series of events over 1959-1960 more than 75% of Christian settlers left the country.

In 2022, the U.S. State Department estimated the current number of Moroccan Christians as more than 40,000. Pew-Templeton estimated (published in 2013) the number of Moroccan Christians at 20,000. The number of the Moroccans who converted to Christianity (most of them secret worshippers) are estimated between 8,000–50,000. Since 1960 a growing number of Moroccan Muslims are converting to Christianity.

== Criminal prohibitions ==
Article 3 of the Moroccan constitution "guarantees to all the free exercise of beliefs". However, the Moroccan criminal code prohibits trying to convert a Muslim to other religions than Islam. Conversions of Muslims to Christianity (either proselytization or apostasy) often occurred during the colonial period, when laws against such conversions did not exist.

According to Article 220 of the Moroccan Penal Code, "anyone who employs incitements to shake the faith of a Muslim or to convert him to another religion" incurs a sentence of three to six months' imprisonment and a fine of 200 to 500 dirhams. Any attempt to induce a Muslim to convert is illegal. Foreign missionaries either limit their proselytizing to non-Muslims or attempt to conduct their work discreetly. In spite of these limitations, a 2015 study estimates some 3,000 believers in Christ from a Muslim background.

In 2023, Morocco was ranked as one of the 30 countries in the world where it is most dangerous to be a Christian.

== History ==
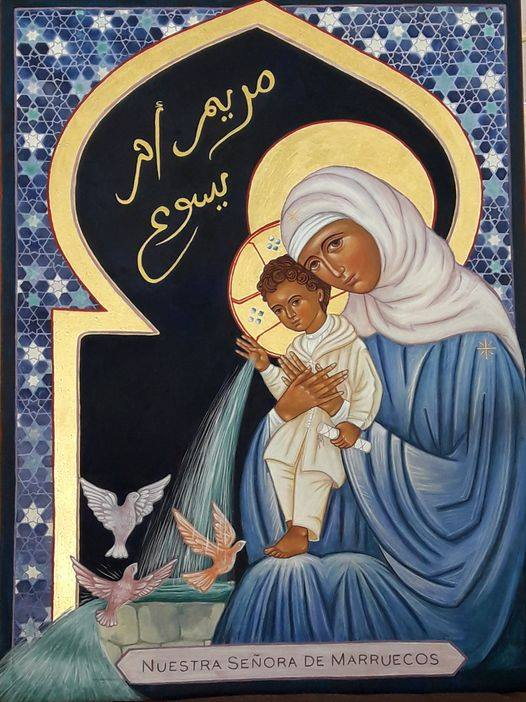
Icon of Our Lady of Morocco.

=== Early Christianity ===
Christianity was introduced to the region in the 2nd century AD, and gained converts in the towns and among slaves as well as among Berber farmers. By the end of the 4th century, the Romanized areas had been Christianized, and inroads had been made among the Berber tribes, who sometimes converted en masse. Schismatic and heretical movements also developed, usually as forms of political protest. The area had a substantial Jewish population as well.

Since the Tetrarchy (Emperor Diocletian's reform of governmental structures in 296), Mauretania Tingitana became part of the Diocese of Hispaniae (a Latin plural) and hence in the Praetorian Prefecture of the Gauls (Mauretania Caesariensis was in the diocese of Africa, in the other pretorian prefecture within the western empire), and remained so until its conquest by the Vandals. According to tradition, the martyrdom of St. Marcellus took place on 28 July 298 at Tingis (Tangier) during the reign of Diocletian.

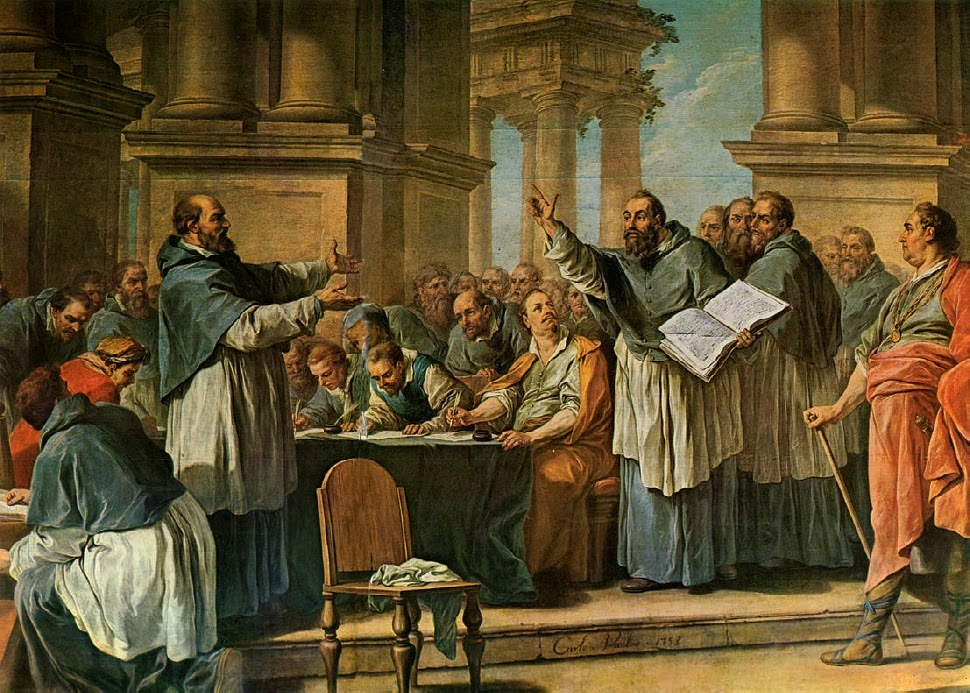
Charles-André van Loo's 18th-century Augustine arguing with Donatists

The Diocletianic Persecution resulted in the so-called heresy of Donatism, which caused a schism in the region. Named after the Berber Christian bishop Donatus Magnus, Donatism flourished during the fourth and fifth centuries.

=== Muslim conquest ===
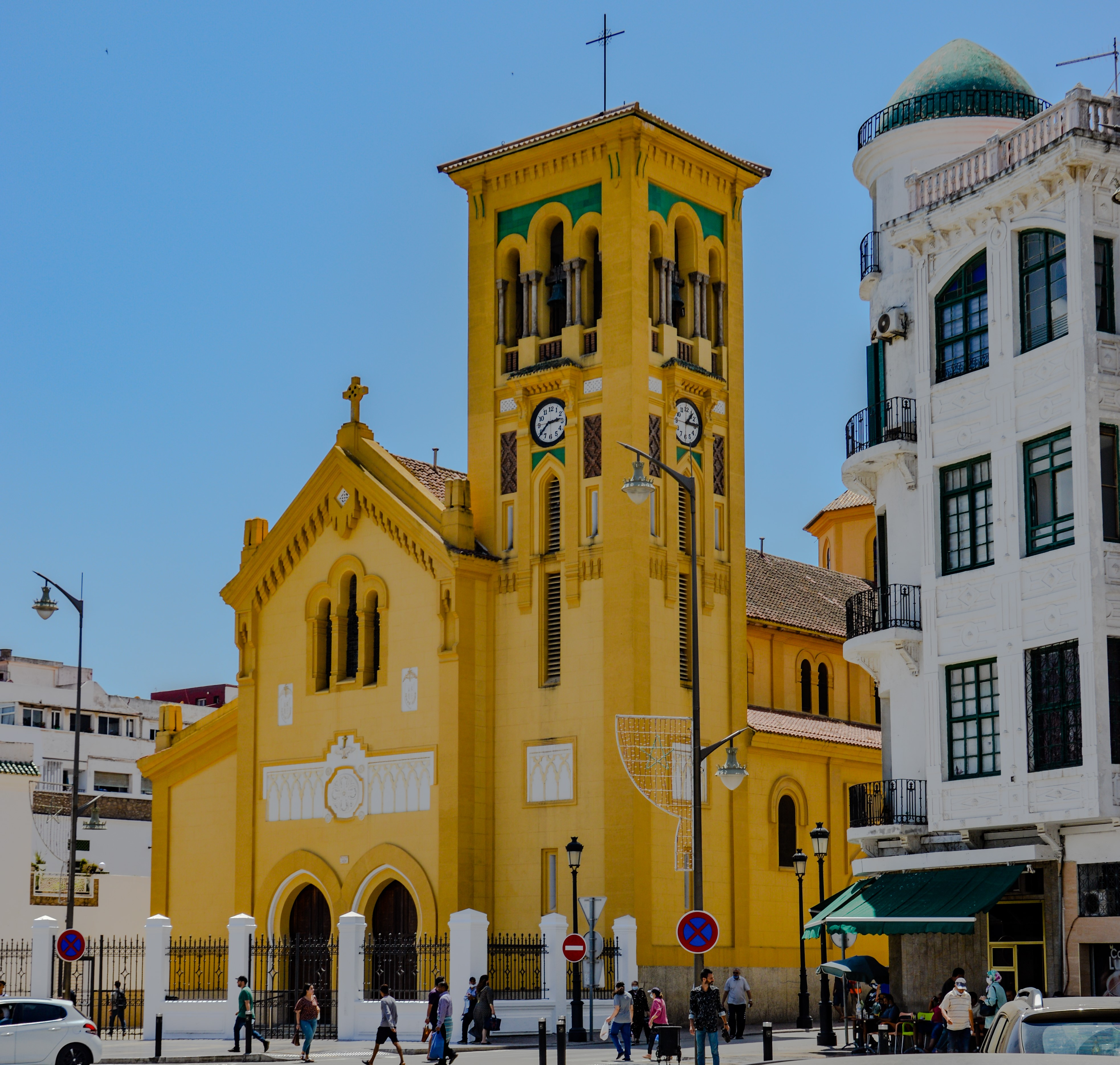
Church of Our Lady of Victory of Tétouan

Archaeological and scholarly research has shown that Christianity existed after the Muslim conquests. The Catholic Church gradually declined along with local Latin dialect. Another view however that exists is that Christianity in North Africa effectively ended soon after the conquest of North Africa by the Islamic Umayyad Caliphate between AD 647–709.

Many causes have been seen as leading to the decline of Christianity in Maghreb. One of them is the constant wars and conquests as well as persecutions. In addition, many Christians also migrated to Europe. The Church at that time lacked the backbone of a monastic tradition and was still suffering from the aftermath of heresies including the so-called Donatist heresy, and this contributed to the early obliteration of the Church in the present day Maghreb. Some historians contrast this with the strong monastic tradition in Coptic Egypt, which is credited as a factor that allowed the Coptic Church to remain the majority faith in that country until around after the 14th century despite numerous persecutions. In addition, the Romans were unable to completely assimilate the indigenous people like the Berbers.

The treatment and persecution of Christians under Almohad rule was a drastic change as well. Many Christians were killed, forced to convert, or forced to flee. Some Christians fled to the Christian kingdoms in the Iberian Peninsula and helped fuel the Reconquista.

Local Catholicism came under pressure when the Muslim fundamentalist regimes of the Almoravids and especially the Almohads came into power, and the record shows persecutions and demands made that the local Christians of Maghreb were forced to convert to Islam. A letter from the 14th century shows that there were still four bishoprics left in North Africa, admittedly a sharp decline from the over four hundred bishoprics in existence at the time of the Arab conquest. The Almohad Abd al-Mu'min forced the Christians and Jews of Tunis and Maghrib to convert in 1159. Berber Christians continued to live in the Maghrib until the early 15th century, and "[i]n the first quarter of the fifteenth century, we even read that the native Christians of Tunis, though much assimilated, extended their church, perhaps because the last of the persecuted Christians from all over the Maghreb had gathered there." Another group of Christians who came to North Africa after being deported from Islamic Spain were called the Mozarabs. They were recognised as forming the Moroccan Church by Pope Innocent IV.

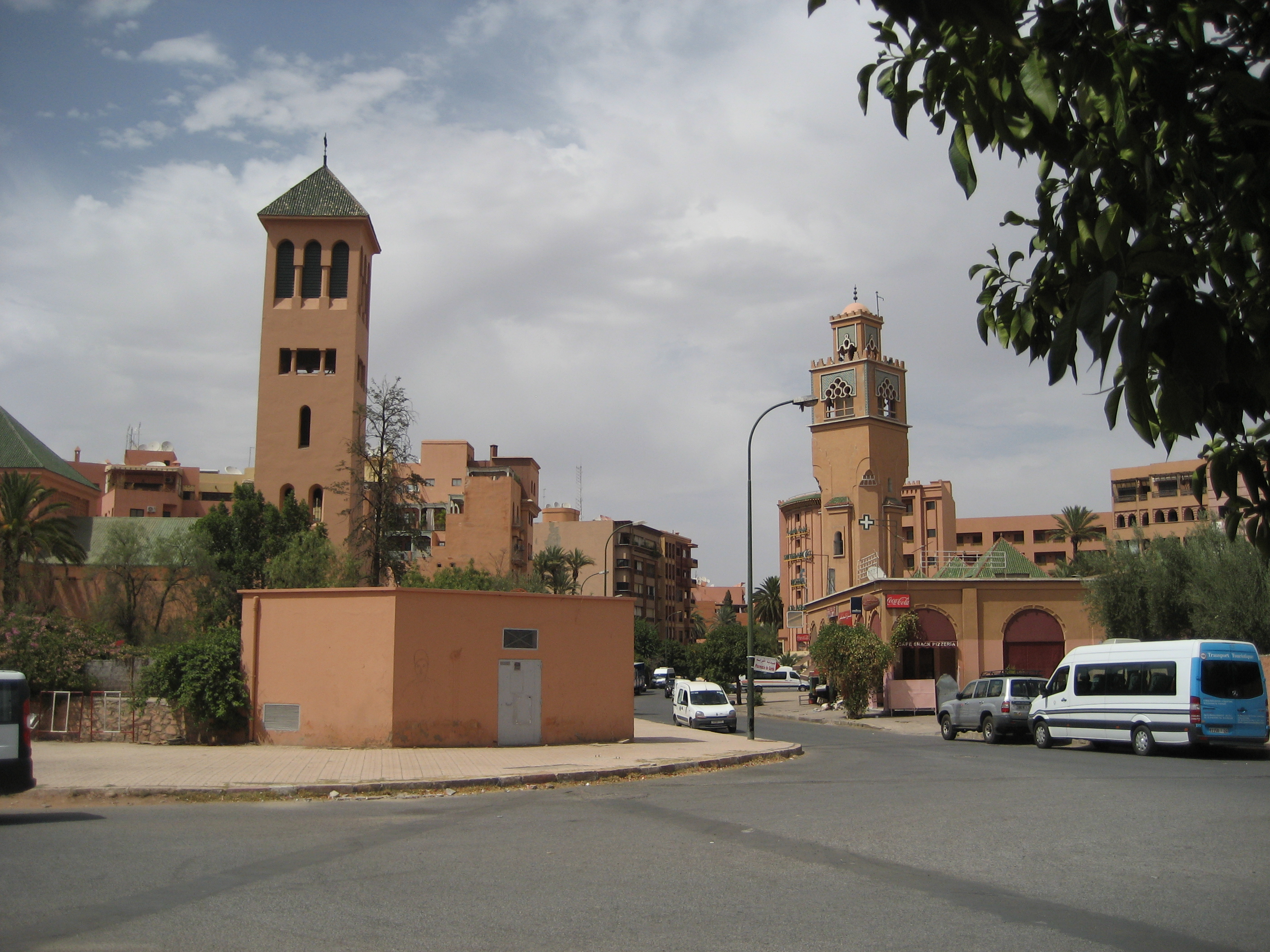
Church of Saints Martyrs in Marrakesh

Another phase of Christianity in Maghreb began with the arrival of the Portuguese in the 15th century. After the end of Reconquista, the Christian Portuguese and Spanish captured many ports in North Africa.

In June 1225, Pope Honorius III issued the bull Vineae Domini custodes, which permitted two friars of the Dominican Order, named Dominic and Martin, to establish a mission in Morocco and look after the affairs of Christians there. The Bishop of Morocco, Lope Fernandez de Ain, was made the head of the Church of Africa, the only church officially allowed to preach in the continent, on 19 December 1246 by Pope Innocent IV. Innocent IV asked the emirs of Tunis, Ceuta and Bugia to permit Lope and Franciscian friars to look after the Christians in those regions. He thanked Caliph al-Sa'id for granting protection to the Christians and requested to allow them to create fortresses along the shores, but the Caliph rejected that request.

The bishopric of Marrakesh continued to exist until the late 16th century and was borne by the suffragans of Seville. Juan de Prado had attempted to re-establish the mission but was killed in 1631. Nevertheless, in 1637 the Franciscan mission was continued and officially allowed to take care of Christian captives and local Christians. Franciscan monasteries continued to exist in Meknes until the 18th century.

=== European influence (c. 1912–1956) ===
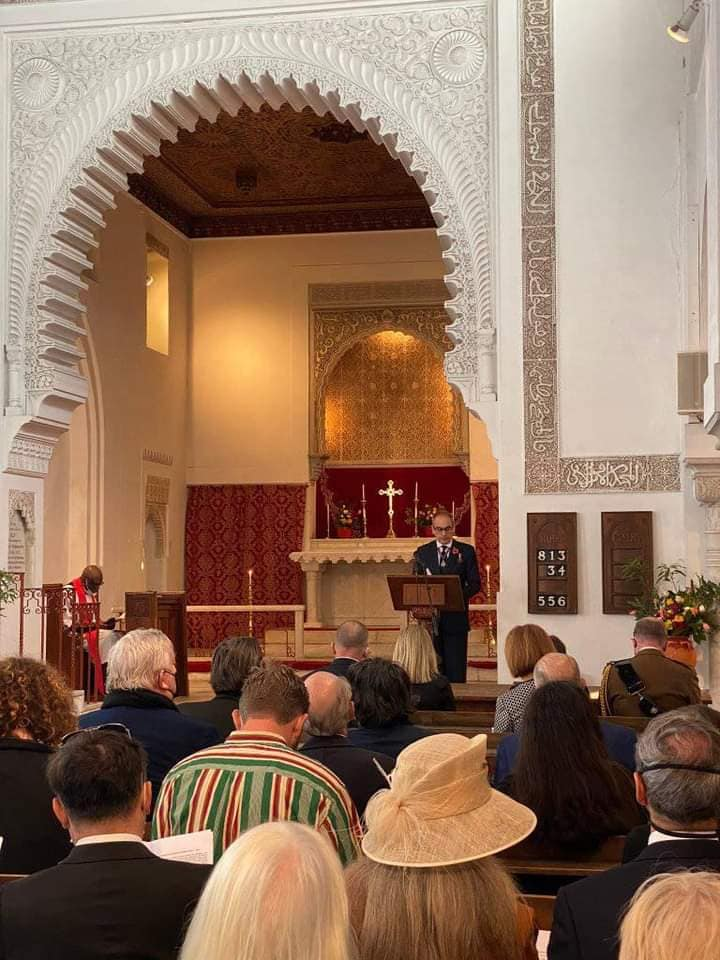
Moroccan Anglican Christians from Tangier

During the era of the Spanish protectorate and the French protectorate over Morocco, the conditions of the Catholic Church have flourished, and Catholic churches, schools, and hospitals were built throughout the country, and until 1961, Sunday mass festivities were broadcast on radio and television networks.

Prior to independence, Morocco was home to half a million European Christian settlers. During the French protectorate in Morocco, European Christians formed almost half the population of the city of Casablanca. Prior to independence, the numbers of the Catholics in French Morocco reached about 360,000 or about 4.1% of the population, Catholics in French Morocco were mostly of French descent, and to a lesser extent of Spanish and Italian ancestry. Some Moroccans of Berber or Arab descent converted to Christianity during the French colonialism. Since independence in 1956, the European population has decreased substantially, and many Catholics left to France or Spain.

Between the last years of the 19th century and the beginning of the 20th century, an estimated 250,000 Spaniard Catholics lived in Morocco. Most Spaniards left Morocco after independence and their numbers were reduced to about 13,000. In the years leading up to the First World War, European Christians formed almost a quarter the population of Tangier. In 1950, Catholics in Spanish protectorate in Morocco and Tangier constitute 14.5% of the population, and the Spanish Morocco was home to 113,000 Catholic settlers. Catholics in Spanish protectorate in Morocco and Tangier were mostly of Spanish descent, and to a lesser extent of Portuguese, French and Italian ancestry.

=== Independent Morocco (since 1956) ===
Independence prompted a mass exodus of the European Catholic settlers; after 1956 more than 75% of Catholic settlers left the country. Today the expatriate Christian community (Catholic and Protestant) consists of 40,000 practicing members, although estimates of Christians residing in the country at any particular time range up to 40,000. Approximately 3,000 foreign residents belong to the Russian and Greek Orthodox churches. Most Christians reside in the Casablanca, Tangier, Marrakesh, and Rabat urban areas. The majority of Christians in Morocco are foreigners, although Voice of the Martyrs reports there is a growing number of native Moroccans (45,000) converting to Christianity, especially in the rural areas. Many of the converts are baptized secretly in Morocco's churches. According to 2021 Report on International Religious Freedom; the number of Moroccan Christian citizens reached approximately 31,500, while the Moroccan Association for Human Rights estimates there are approximately 25,000 Moroccan Christian citizens.

Since 1960 a growing number of Moroccan Muslims are converting to Christianity. Many Moroccan Christians of Berber or Arab descent mostly converted during the modern era or under and after French colonialism.

During the 2020s, Christianity in Morocco has experienced a revitalization due to Christian migrants arriving from sub-Saharan Africa.

== Denominations ==
=== Catholicism ===
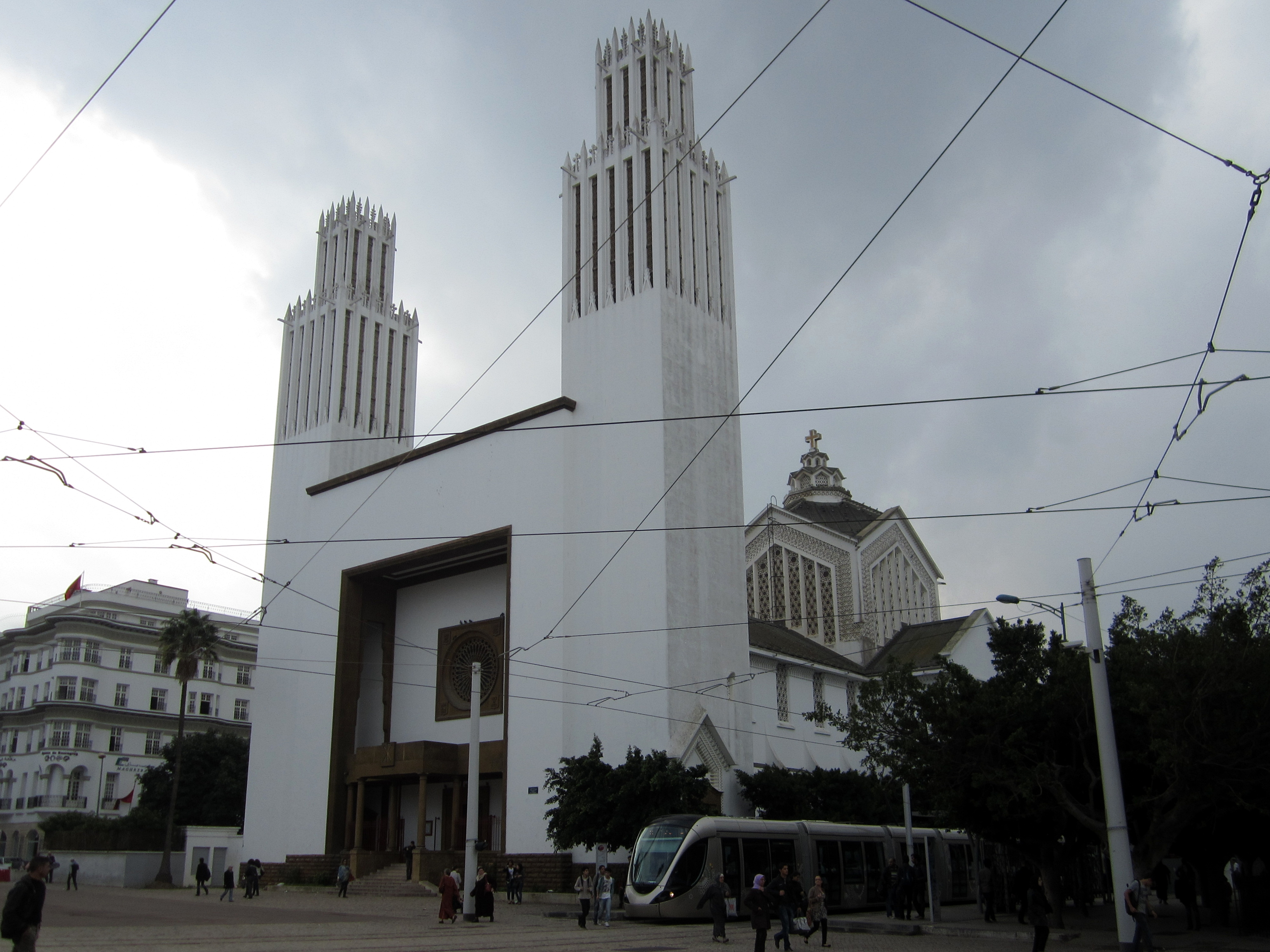
St. Peter's Cathedral, Rabat

Christianity has had a long presence in Morocco, dating back to the Roman Empire. The French and Spanish colonization of North Africa in the nineteenth and twentieth century further embedded Catholicism in the region. During the era of the Spanish protectorate and the French protectorate over Morocco, the conditions of the Catholic Church have flourished, and Catholic churches, schools, and hospitals were built throughout the country, and until 1961, Sunday mass festivities were broadcast on radio and television networks.

During the French and Spanish protectorates, Morocco had significant populations of European Catholic settlers: on the eve of independence, an estimated 470,000 Catholics resided in Morocco. Since independence in 1956, the European Catholic population has decreased substantially, and many Catholics left to France or Spain. Prior to independence, the European Catholic settlers had historic legacy and powerful presence. Independence prompted a mass exodus of the European Catholic settlers; after series of events over 1959–1960 more than 75% of Catholic settlers left the country.

Today there are around 30,000 Catholics in Morocco. Most of them are European expatriates, principally French and Spanish due to the country's historic ties to France and Spain. Another group is composed of Sub-Saharan immigrants, mainly students. The country is divided into two archdioceses; Rabat and Tangier. In 2022, over 12,000 students enrolled in 16 Catholic schools across the country. Catholic-run schools typically use French as language of instructions after primary school.

=== Protestantism ===
==== Anglicanism ====
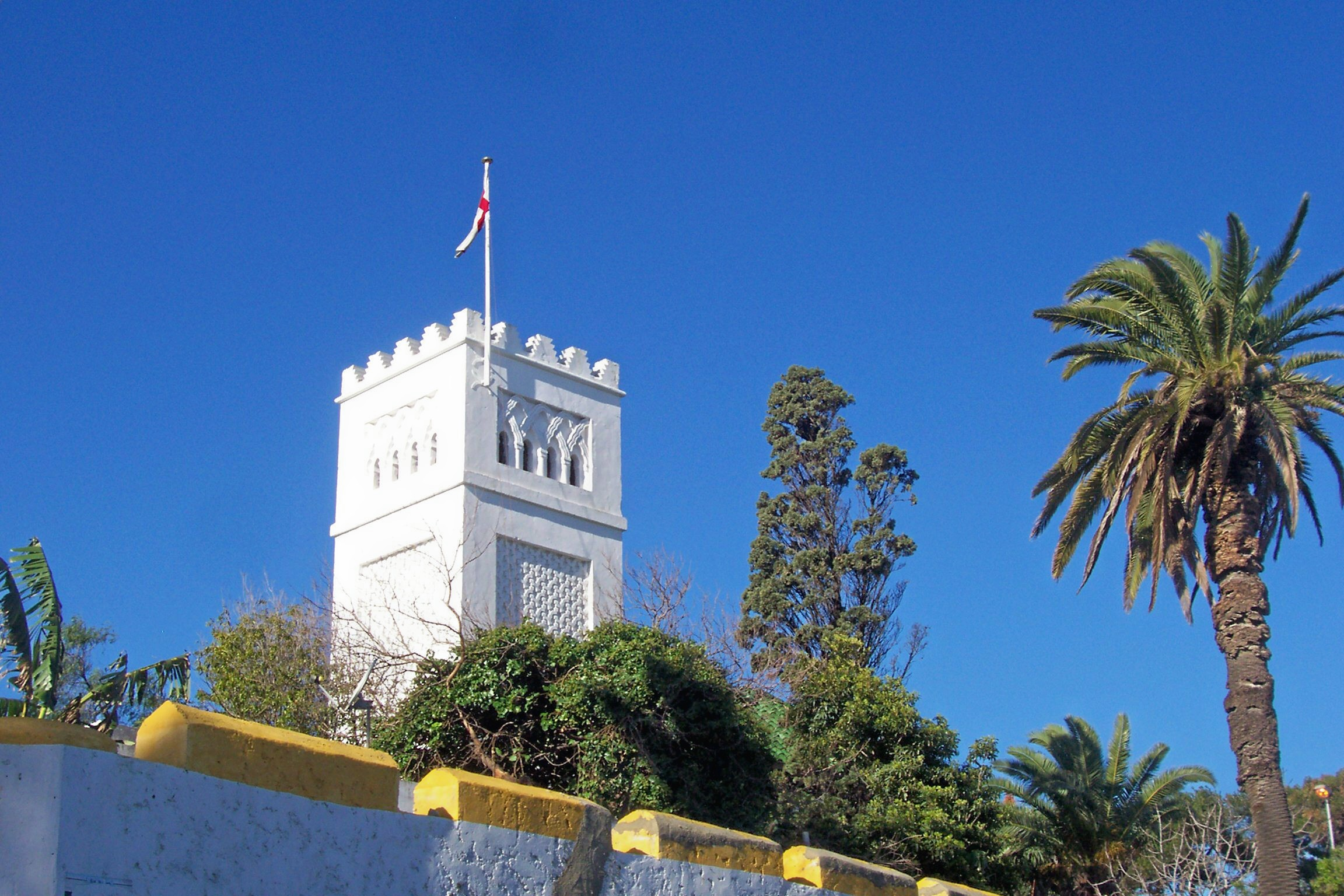
Church of Saint Andrew, Tangier

While most areas of Africa (including eastern North Africa) have independent Anglican dioceses and provinces, the western part of North Africa, including the Anglican Church of Morocco, is part of the Diocese of Europe, which is itself part of the Province of Canterbury in the Church of England. There are two permanent chaplaincies, one in Casablanca and one in Tangier. Small groups of Anglicans have worshipped together in Marrakesh, but there is no Anglican Church established here.

The Anglican Church of Saint Andrew, Tangier has become a tourist attraction, partly due to certain well-known figures buried in its churchyard. The church is an early twentieth-century replacement for an earlier smaller building, which was built with the express permission of the King of Morocco, on land donated by him.

The Anglican Church of Saint John the Evangelist, Casablanca, is centrally located, near to the Hyatt Regency hotel in the city centre. It has a well-established congregation, and holds two services every Sunday morning to accommodate all worshippers. There is a catechetical programme for children.

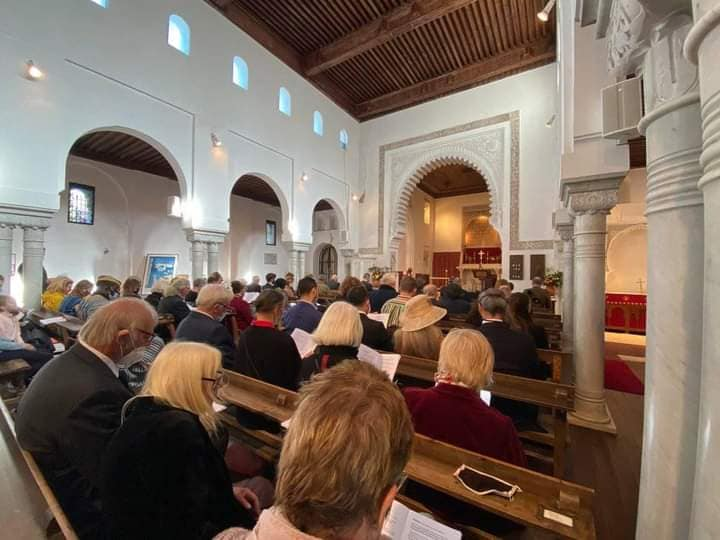
Moroccan Protestants from Tangier

On 27 March 2010, the Moroccan magazine TelQuel stated that thousands of Moroccans had converted to Christianity. Pointing out the absence of official data, Service de presse Common Ground, cites unspecified sources that stated that about 5,000 Moroccans became Christians between 2005 and 2010. An estimate credits a Christian program by Brother Rachid with involvement in the conversion of many Muslims in North Africa and the Middle East to Christianity, including 150,000 in Morocco.

Since 1960 a growing number of Moroccan Muslims are converting to Christianity. Many Moroccan Christians of Berber or Arab descent mostly converted during the modern era or under and after French colonialism.

=== Eastern Orthodoxy ===
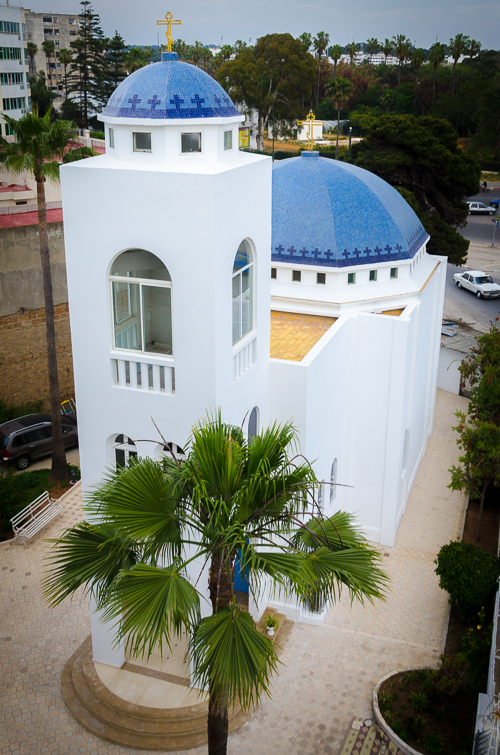
The Russian Orthodox Church in Rabat

There are three functioning Eastern Orthodox churches in Morocco: a Greek Orthodox Church in Casablanca and Russian Orthodox Churches in Rabat and Casablanca.

== Notable Christian Moroccans ==
- Baldassare Diego Loyola, Moroccan prince of the Saadi dynasty who converted from Islam to Roman Catholicism and became a Jesuit priest
- Danièle Henkel, businesswoman, author, television personalit
- Malika Oufkir, Moroccan writer
- Muley Xeque, Moroccan prince
- Noah Sadaoui, football player
- Jean-Mohammed Abd-el-Jalil, Franciscan friar and Islamicist
- Leo Africanus, diplomat and author

== See also ==
- Religion in Morocco
- Islam in Morocco
- Catholic Church in Morocco
- Protestantism in Morocco
- Arab Christians
- Berber Christians
- Bahá'í Faith in Morocco
- History of the Jews in Morocco
- Freedom of religion in Morocco
- Irreligion in Morocco
