= Evangelical Church in Morocco =

The Protestant missions started in the 19th century in Morocco. In 1975 the Scottish origin Southern Morocco Mission was started. In 1922 the Reformed Church in France begun mission efforts especially among French. After the independence from France in 1956 the Reformed Church in France decided to form an independent church in 1958. This became the Evangelical Church in Morocco or the Église Évangelique au Maroc in French. Since 1963 missions were prohibited.

In 2004 the church had 1,600 members worshipping in 8 congregations and 6 house fellowships.

It is member of the World Communion of Reformed Churches.
