= Church (building) =

Place of worship for Christians

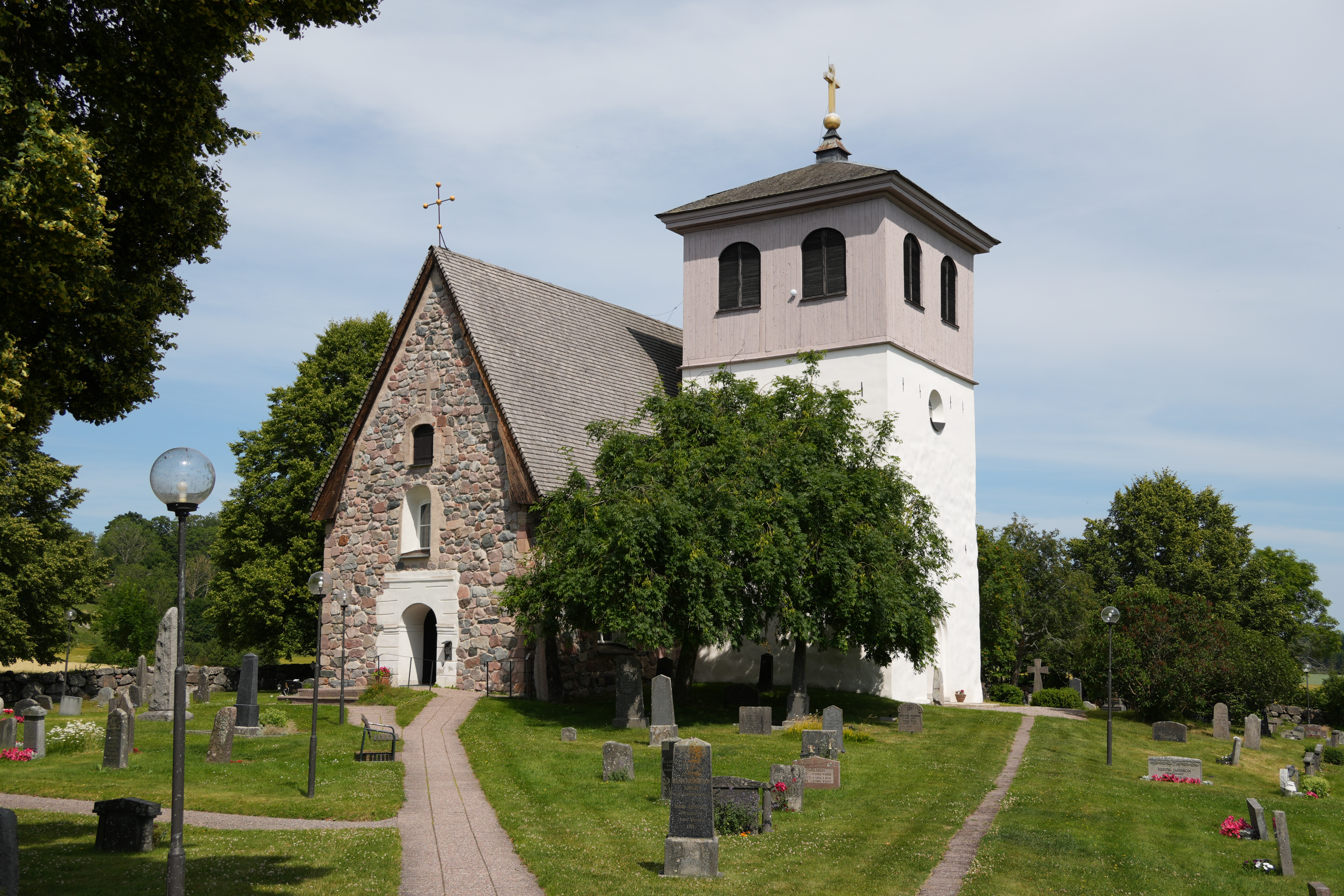
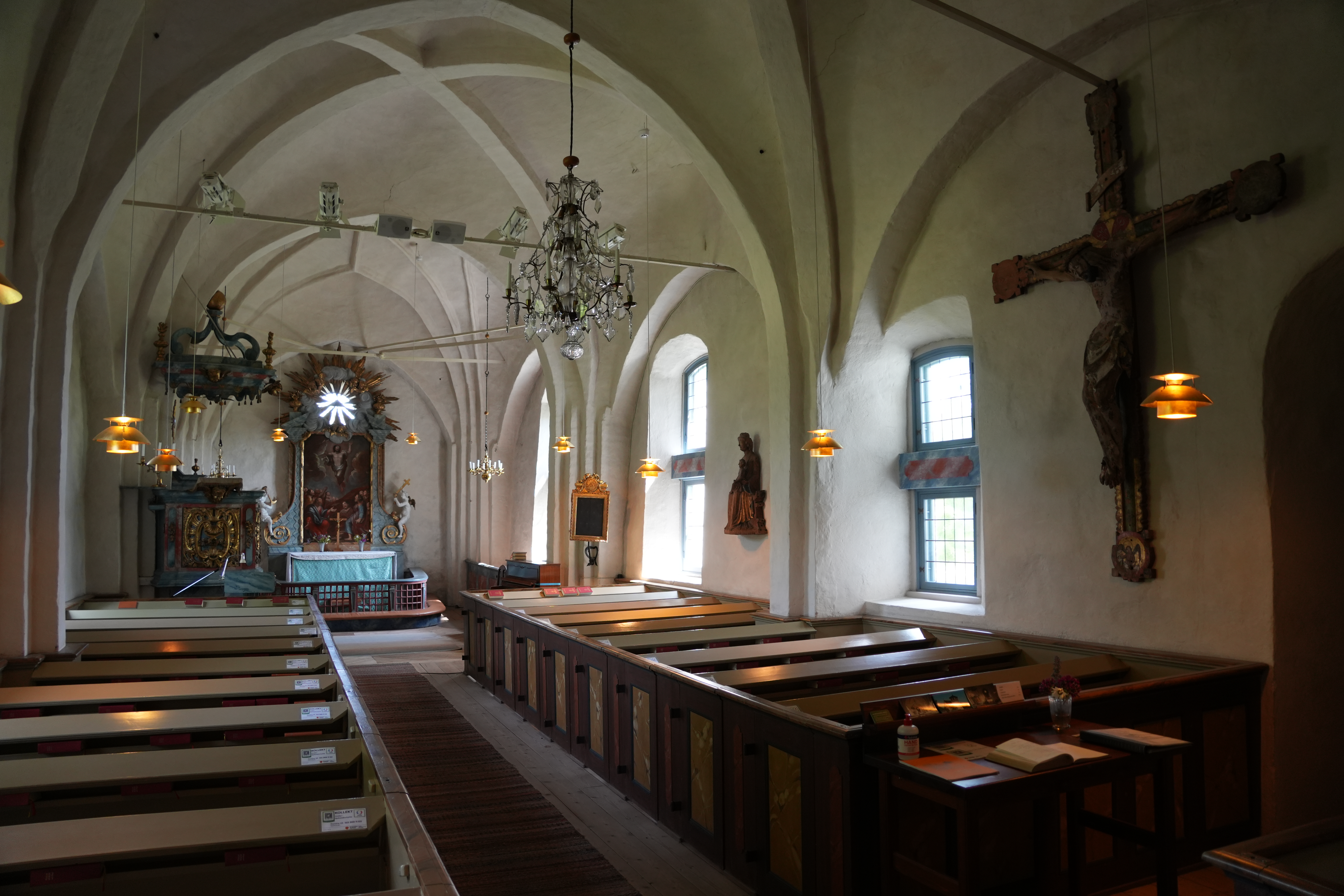
Husby Sjuhundra Church (Evangelical-Lutheran) in Norrtälje, Sweden. Its church bells (housed in the belltower) are used to call the faithful to Christian prayer and worship.

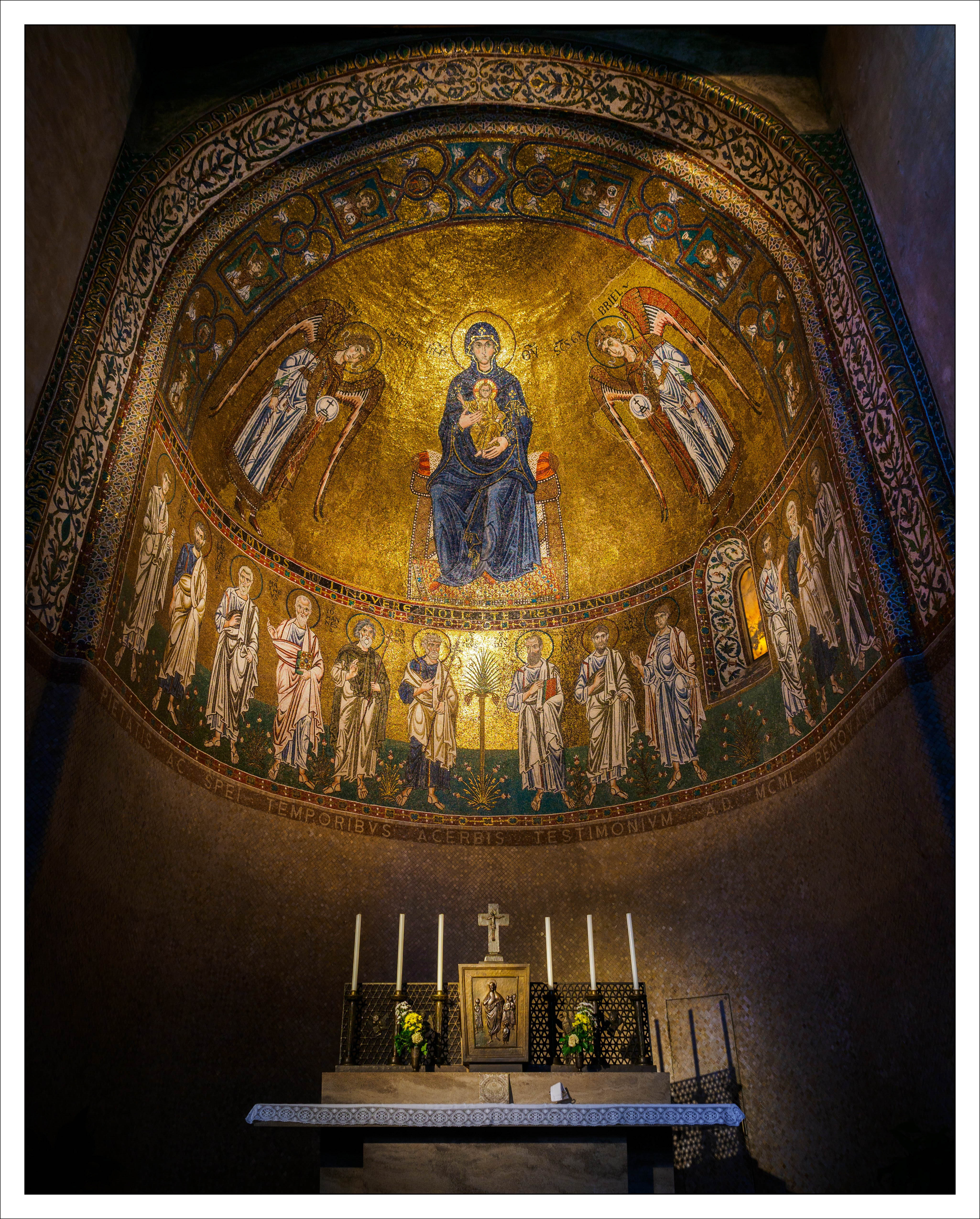
Trieste Cathedral, a church dedicated to Saint Justus, completed in 1320. It featured iconography of the Virgin and Child.

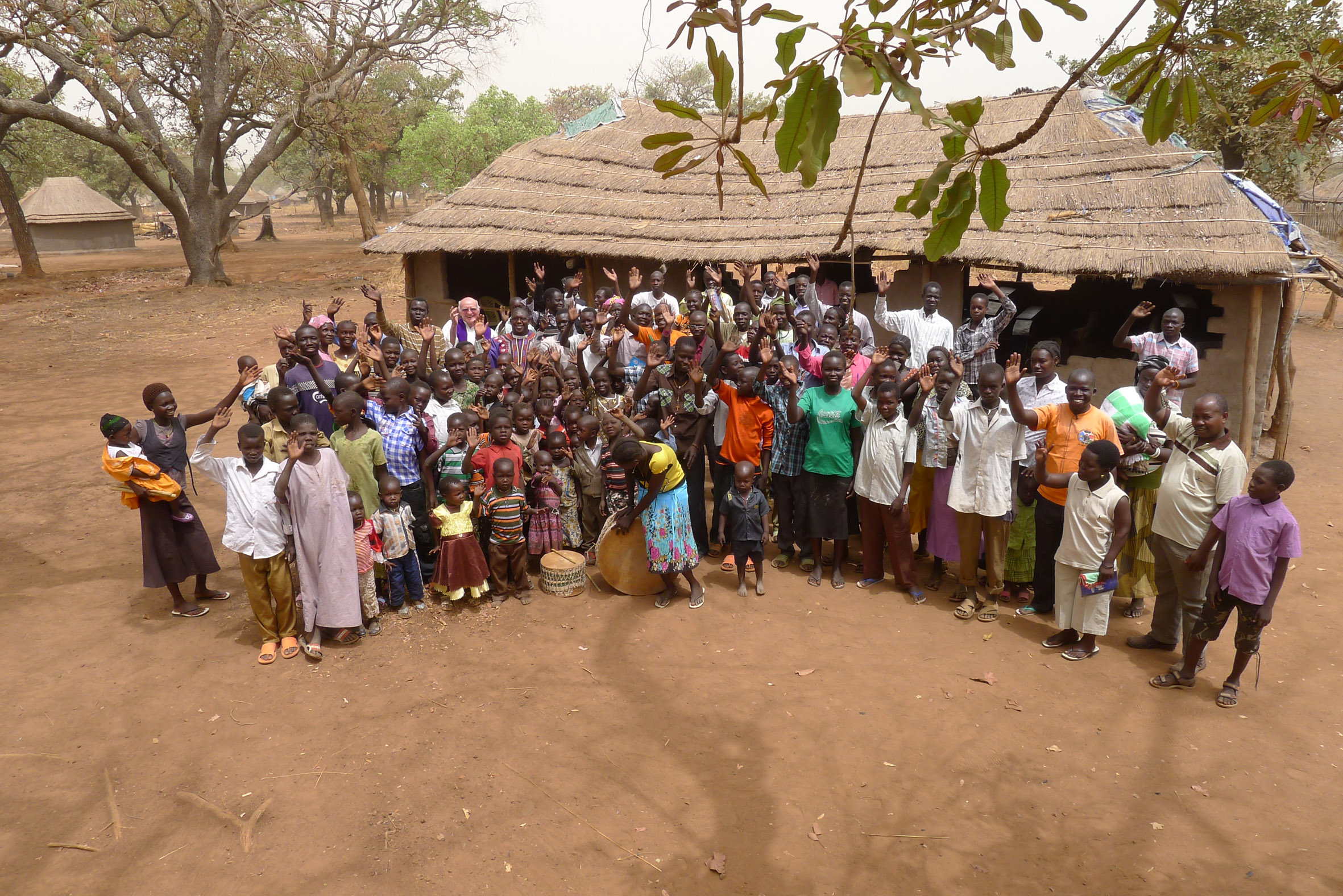
A village church in South Sudan

A church, church building, or church house is a building used for Christian worship services and other Christian religious activities. The earliest identified Christian church is a house church founded between 233 AD and 256 AD.

Sometimes, the word church is used erroneously to refer to the buildings of other religions, such as mosques and synagogues. Church is also used to describe a body or an assembly of Christian believers, while "the Church" may be used to refer to the worldwide Christian religious community as a whole.

In traditional Christian architecture, the plan view of a church often forms a Christian cross with the centre aisle and seating representing the vertical beam and the bema and altar forming the horizontal. The area of the church containing the altar is the chancel. Churches are usually topped with a steeple, which metaphorically directs the minds of the faithful upward to God. Steeples often house a belfry that contains church bells, which call Christians to Christian prayer and worship. Modern churches have a variety of architectural styles and layouts. Some buildings designed for other purposes have been converted to churches, while many original church buildings have been put to other uses. From the 11th to the 14th century, there had been a wave of church construction in Western Europe.

Many churches worldwide are of considerable historical, national, cultural, and architectural significance, with several included in the list of UNESCO World Heritage Sites.

== Etymology ==
Cyrican is an Old English word for churches and church property

The word church is derived from Old English cirice, 'place of assemblage set aside for Christian worship', from the Common Germanic word kirika. This was probably borrowed via Gothic from Ancient Greek kyriakon doma, 'the Lord's (house)', from kyrios, 'ruler, lord'. Kyrios in turn comes from the Indo-European root *ḱewh₁-, meaning 'to spread out, to swell' (euphemistically: 'to prevail, to be strong').

The various forms of the cognates to church in various languages reflect the word's linguistic roots in Greek and Proto-Indo-European origins. For instance, in early Germanic languages such as Old High German, the word evolved into kirihha, highlighting its spread through the Christianization of Germanic peoples. This etymological journey illustrates how the concept of a place of Christian worship was linguistically adapted as Christianity expanded across Europe. Additionally, the use of the word in early Christian communities emphasized the association of the building with its dedication to God.

The Greek kyriakon, 'of the Lord', has been used of houses of Christian worship since c. AD 300, especially in the East, although it was less common in this sense than ekklesia or basilike.

== History ==
=== Antiquity ===
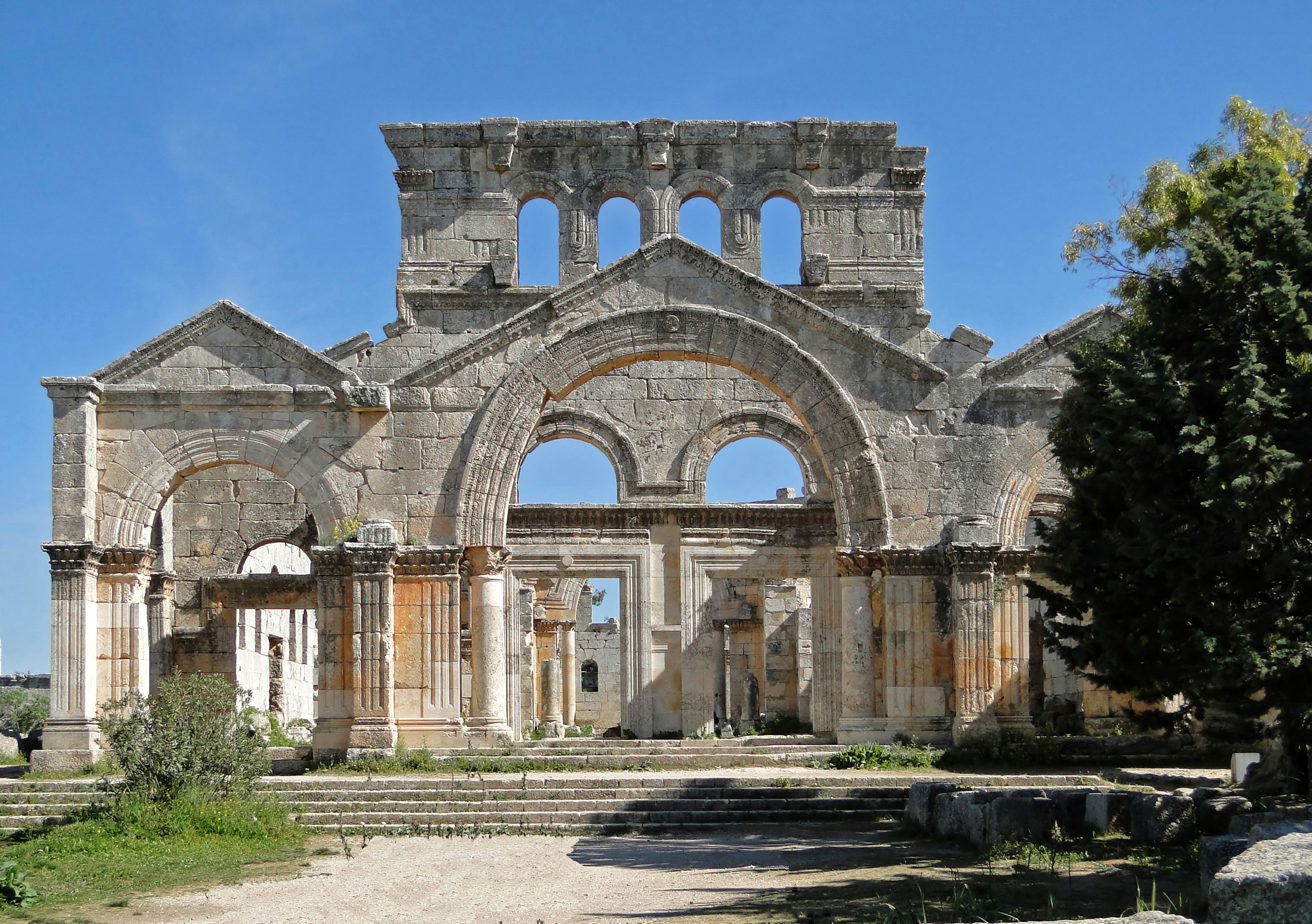
South facade of the Church of Saint Simeon Stylites in Aleppo, Syria, is considered to be one of the oldest surviving church buildings in the world.

The earliest archeologically identified Christian church is a house church (domus ecclesiae), the Dura-Europos church, founded between 233 AD and 256 AD.

In the second half of the third century AD, the first purpose-built halls for Christian worship (aula ecclesiae) began to be constructed. Although many of these were destroyed early in the next century during the Diocletianic Persecution. Even larger and more elaborate churches began to appear during the reign of Emperor Constantine the Great.

=== Medieval times ===
From the 11th through the 14th centuries, a wave of cathedral building and the construction of smaller parish churches occurred across Western Europe. Besides serving as a place of worship, the cathedral or parish church was frequently employed as a general gathering place by the communities in which they were located, hosting such events as guild meetings, banquets, mystery plays, and fairs. Church grounds and buildings were also used for the threshing and storage of grain.

==== Romanesque architecture ====
Between 1000 and 1200, the Romanesque style became popular across Europe. The Romanesque style is defined by large and bulky edifices typically composed of simple, compact, sparsely decorated geometric structures. Frequent features of the Romanesque church include circular arches, round or octagonal towers, and cushion capitals on pillars. In the early Romanesque era, coffering on the ceiling was fashionable, while later in the same era, groined vaults gained popularity. Interiors widened, and the motifs of sculptures took on more epic traits and themes. Romanesque architects adopted many Roman or early Christian architectural ideas, such as a cruciform ground plan, as that of Angoulême Cathedral, and the basilica system of a nave with a central vessel and side aisles.

==== Gothic architecture ====
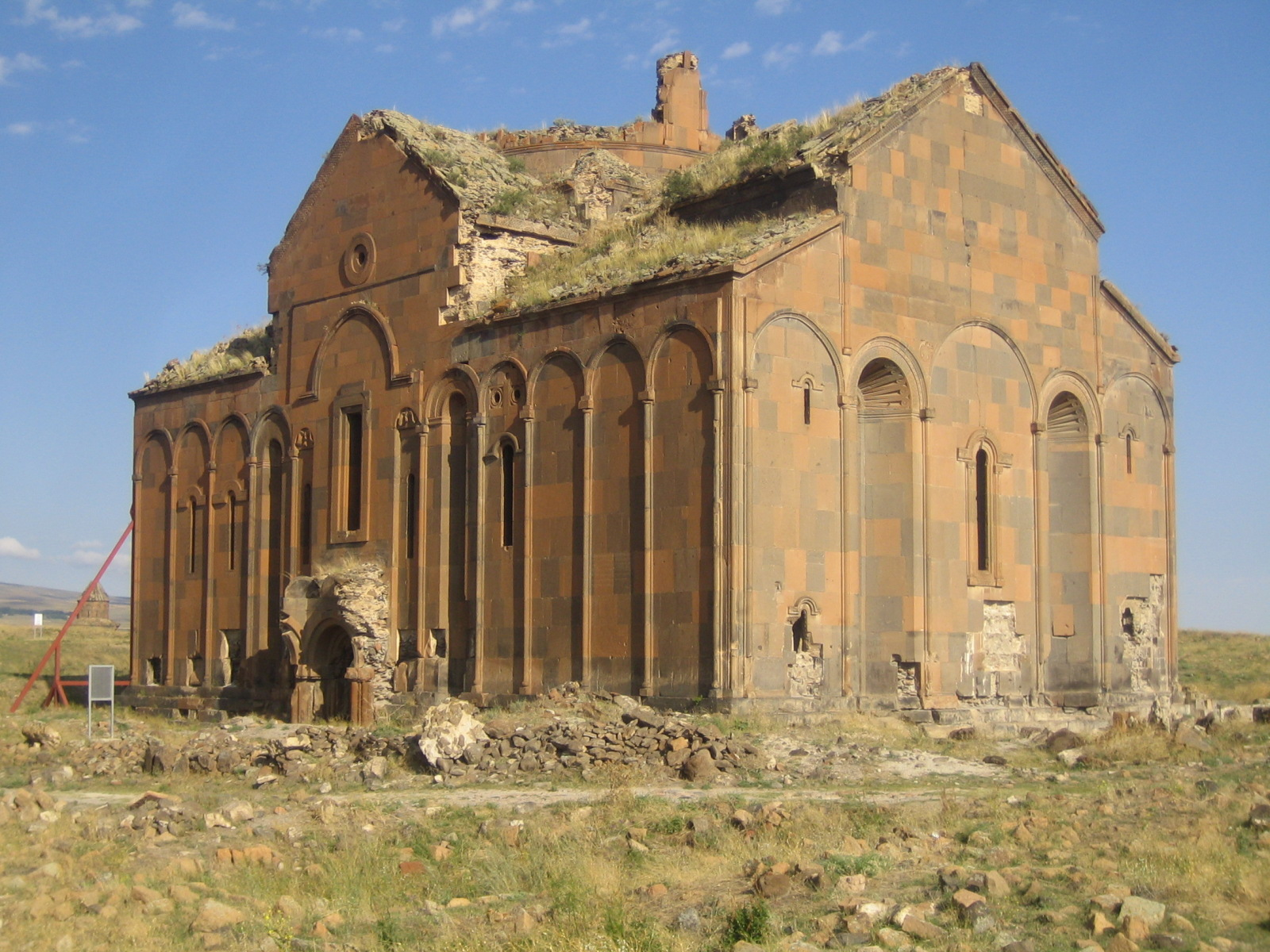
The Cathedral of Ani, one of the founders of the Gothic style of architecture

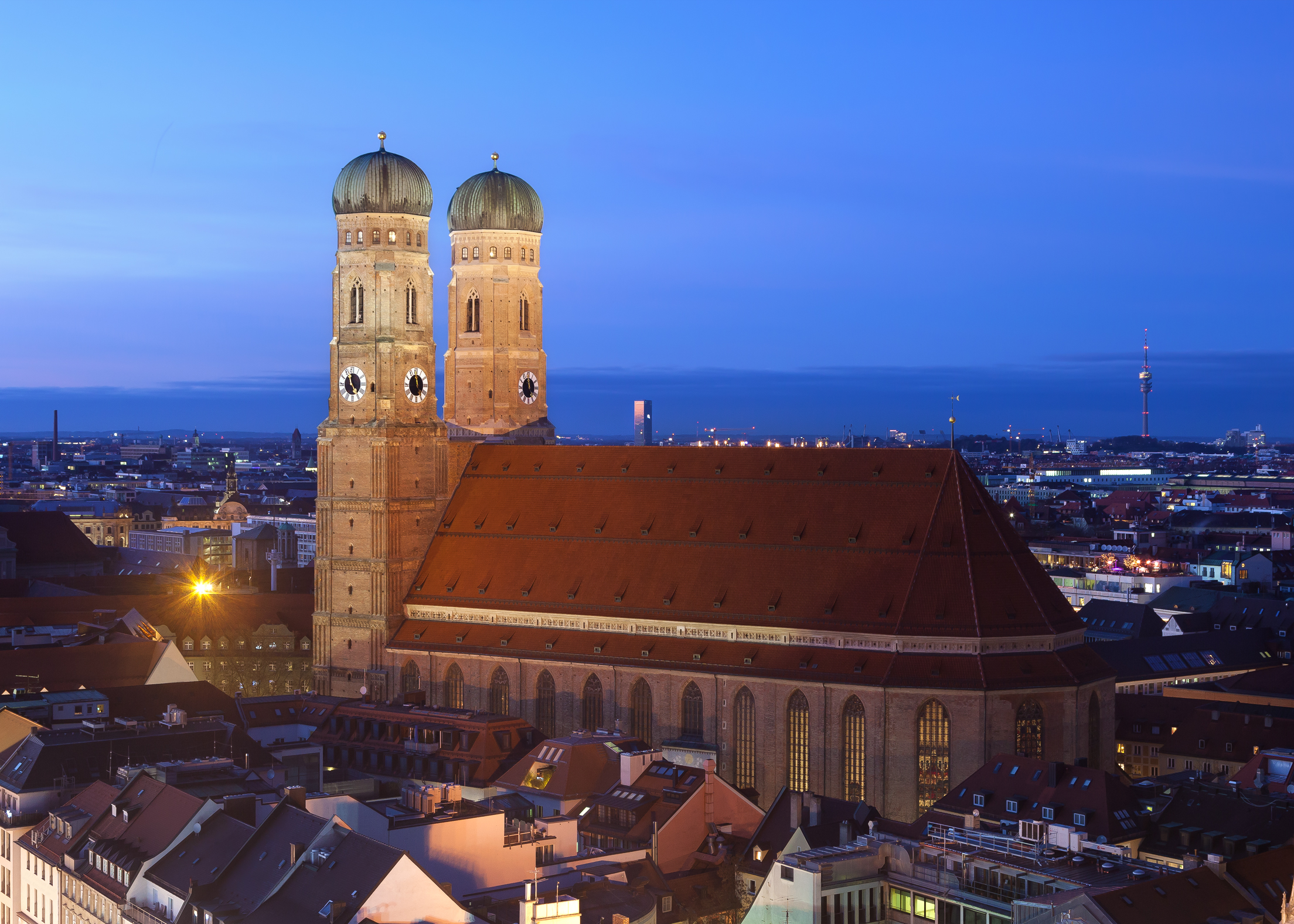
The Frauenkirche in Munich is a largely Gothic, medieval church.

The Gothic style emerged around 1140 in Île-de-France and subsequently spread throughout Europe. Gothic churches lost the compact qualities of the Romanesque era, and decorations often contained symbolic and allegorical features. The first pointed arches, rib vaults, and buttresses began to appear, all possessing geometric properties that reduced the need for large, rigid walls to ensure structural stability. This also permitted the size of windows to increase, producing brighter and lighter interiors. Nave ceilings rose, and pillars and steeples heightened. Many architects used these developments to push the limits of structural possibility – an inclination that resulted in the collapse of several towers whose designs had unwittingly exceeded the boundaries of soundness. In Germany, the Netherlands and Spain, it became popular to build hall churches, a style in which every vault would be built to the same height.

Gothic cathedrals were lavishly designed, as in the Romanesque era, and many share Romanesque traits. However, several also exhibit unprecedented degrees of detail and complexity in decoration. Notre-Dame de Paris and Reims Cathedral in France, as well as the church of San Francesco d'Assisi in Palermo, Salisbury Cathedral and the wool churches in England, and Santhome Church in Chennai, India, show the elaborate stylings characteristic of Gothic cathedrals.

Some of the most well-known gothic churches remained unfinished for centuries after the style fell out of popularity. One such example is the construction of Cologne Cathedral, which began in 1248, was halted in 1473, and didn't resume until 1842.

=== Renaissance ===
In the fifteenth and sixteenth centuries, the changes in ethics and society due to the Renaissance and the Reformation also influenced the building of churches. The common style was much like the Gothic style but simplified. The basilica was not the most popular type of church anymore, but instead, hall churches were built. Typical features are columns and classical capitals.

In Protestant churches, where the proclamation of God's Word is of particular importance, the visitor's line of sight is directed towards the pulpit.

=== Baroque architecture ===
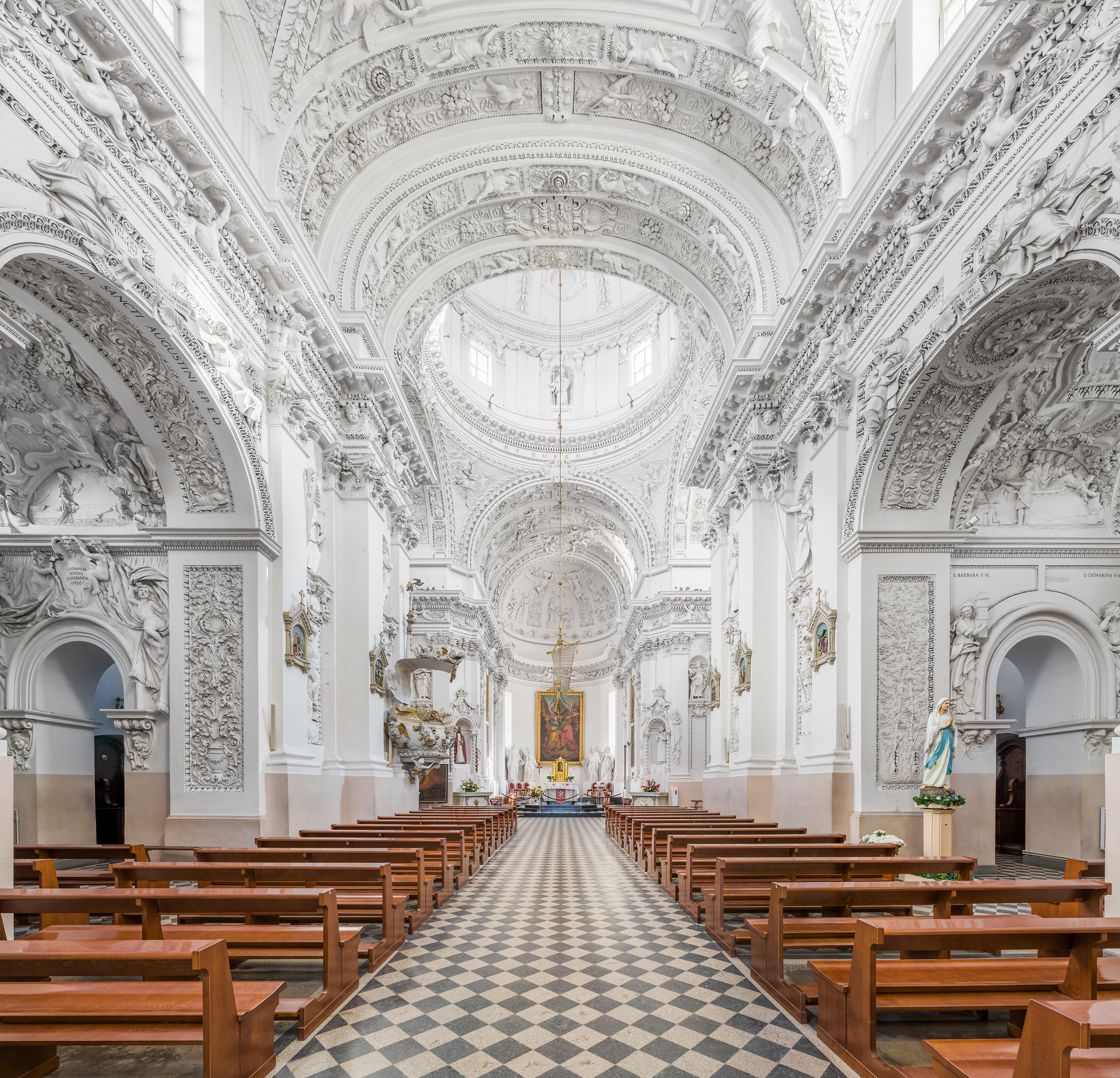
Central nave of the Church of St. Peter and St. Paul, Vilnius, Lithuania, an example of a Baroque church interior

The Baroque style was first used in Italy around 1575. From there, it spread to the rest of Europe and the European colonies. The building industry increased heavily during the Baroque era. Buildings, even churches, were used to indicate wealth, authority, and influence. The use of forms known from the Renaissance was extremely exaggerated. Domes and capitals were decorated with moulding, and the former stucco sculptures were replaced by fresco paintings on the ceilings. For the first time, churches were seen as one connected work of art, and consistent artistic concepts were developed. Instead of long buildings, more central-plan buildings were created. The sprawling decoration with floral ornamentation and mythological motives lasted until about 1720, in the Rococo era.

The Protestant parishes preferred lateral churches, in which all the visitors could be as close as possible to the pulpit and the altar.

== Architecture ==
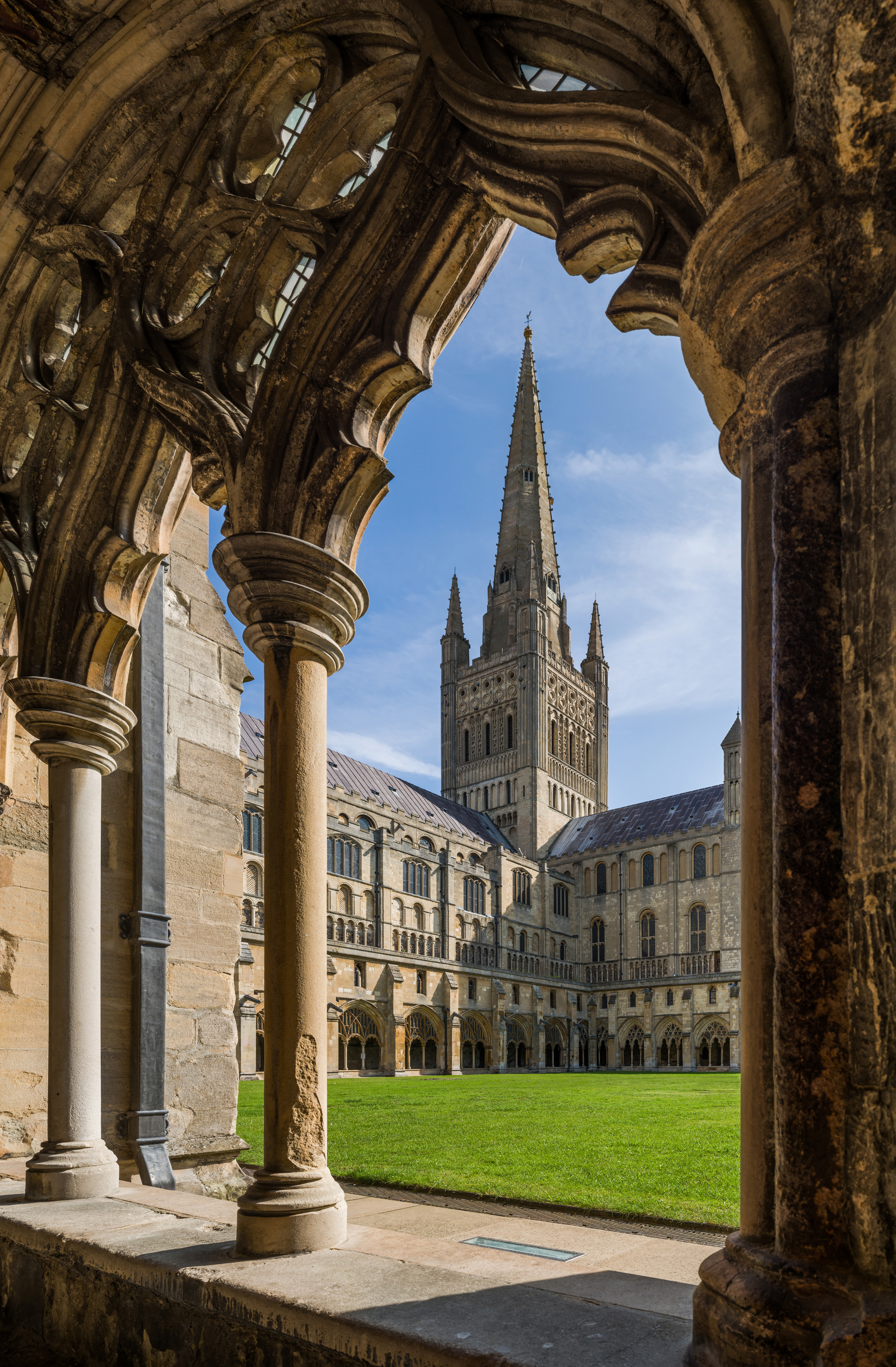
The view of the spire of Norwich Cathedral from the cloisters, in Norfolk, England

A common trait of the architecture of many churches is the shape of a cross (a long central rectangle, with side rectangles and a rectangle in front for the altar space or sanctuary). These churches also often have a dome or other large vaulted space in the interior to represent or draw attention to the heavens. Other common shapes for churches include a circle, to represent eternity, or an octagon or similar star shape, to represent the church's bringing light to the world. Another common feature is the spire, a tall tower at the "west" end of the church or over the crossing.

Another common feature of many Christian churches is the eastwards orientation of the front altar. Often, the altar will not be oriented due east but toward the sunrise. This tradition originated in Byzantium in the fourth century and became prevalent in the West in the eighth and ninth centuries. The old Roman custom of having the altar at the west end and the entrance at the east was sometimes followed as late as the eleventh century, even in areas of northern Europe under Frankish rule, as seen in Petershausen (Constance), Bamberg Cathedral, Augsburg Cathedral, Regensburg Cathedral, and Hildesheim Cathedral.

The architecture of evangelical places of worship, such as those of the Baptist and Methodist traditions, are often characterized by their sobriety. The Latin cross is a well known Christian symbol that can usually be seen on the building of an evangelical church and that identifies the place's belonging. There is usually a baptistery at the front of the church (called the chancel in historic traditions) or in a separate room.

== Types ==
=== Basilica ===
The Latin word basilica was initially used to describe a Roman public building usually located in the forum of a Roman town. After the Roman Empire became officially Christian, the term came by extension to refer to a large and influential church that has been given special ceremonial rights by the Pope. The word thus retains two senses today, one architectural and the other ecclesiastical.

=== Cathedral ===
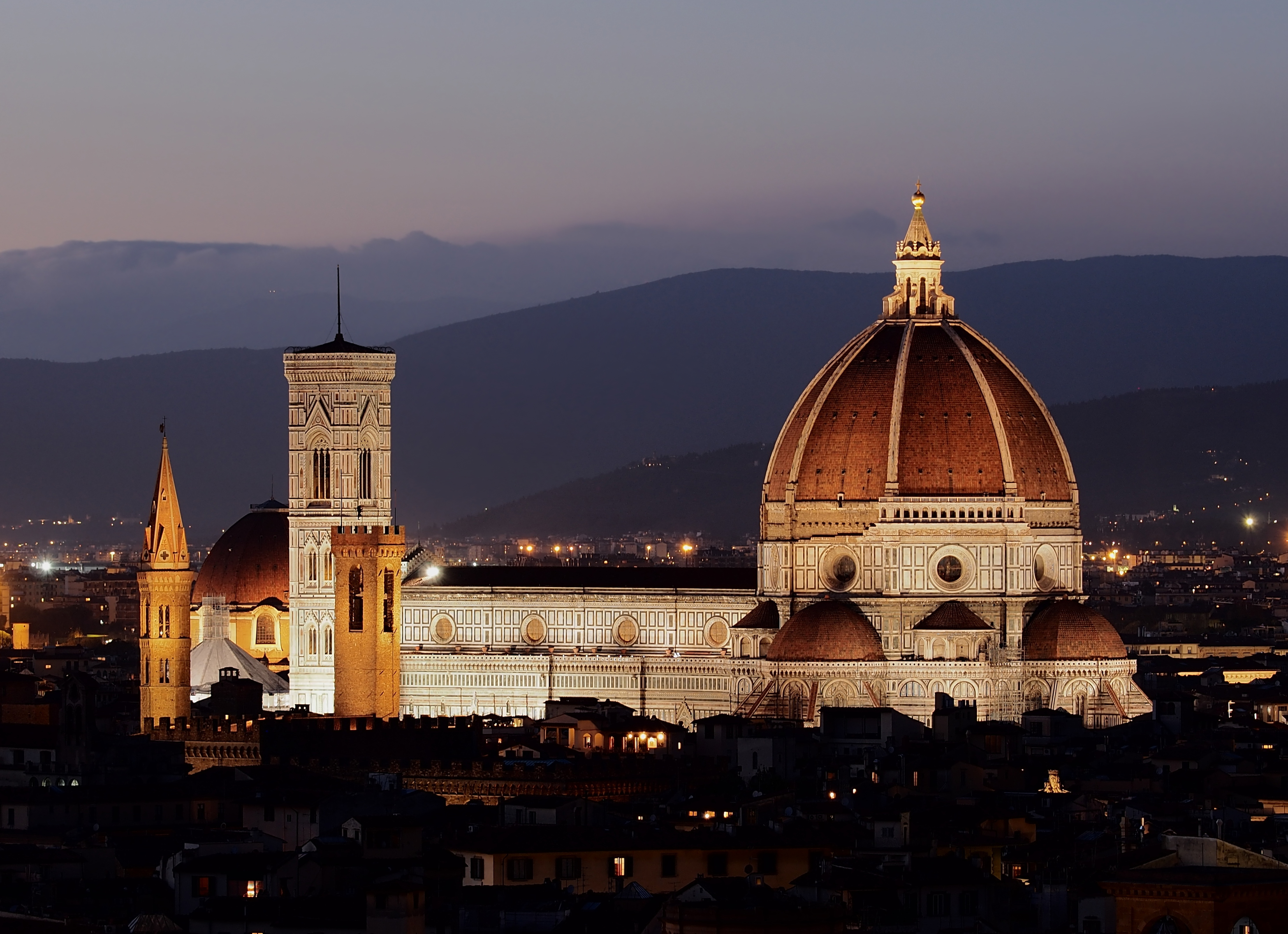
Florence Cathedral

A cathedral is a church, usually Catholic, Anglican, Oriental Orthodox or Eastern Orthodox, housing the seat of a bishop. The word cathedral takes its name from cathedra, or Bishop's Throne (In Latin: ecclesia cathedralis). The term is sometimes (improperly) used to refer to any church of great size.

A church with a cathedral function is not necessarily a large building. It might be as small as Christ Church Cathedral in Oxford, England, Porvoo Cathedral in Porvoo, Finland, Sacred Heart Cathedral in Raleigh, United States, or Chur Cathedral in Switzerland. However, frequently, the cathedral, along with some of the abbey churches, was the largest building in any region.

Cathedrals tend to display a higher level of contemporary architectural style and the work of accomplished craftsmen, and occupy a status both ecclesiastical and social that an ordinary parish church rarely has. Such churches are generally among the finest buildings locally and a source of national and regional pride, and many are among the world's most renowned works of architecture.

=== Chapel ===
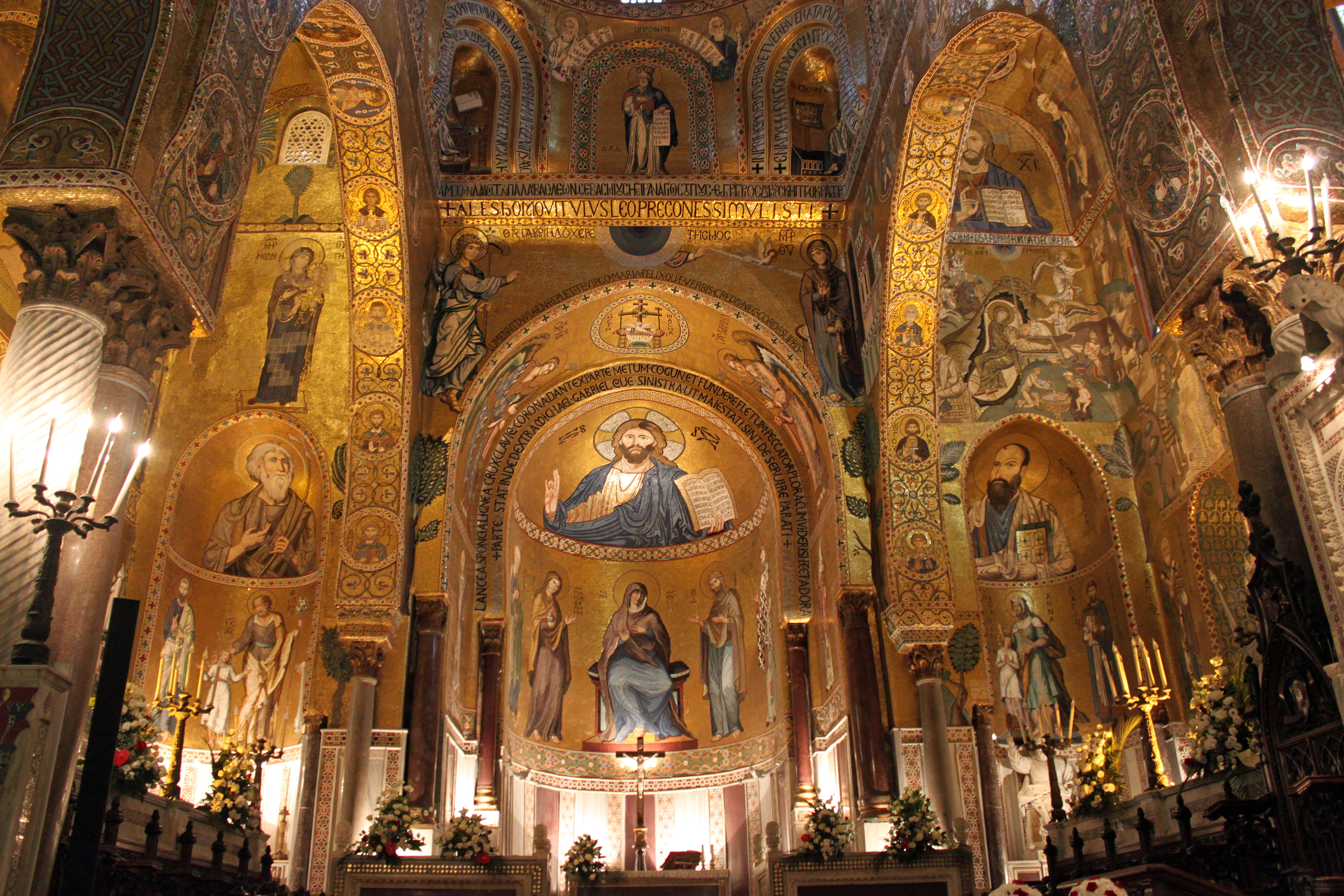
Cappella Palatina, Palermo, Sicily

Either, a discrete space with an altar inside a larger cathedral, conventual, parish, or other church; or, a free standing small church building or room not connected to a larger church, to serve a particular hospital, school, university, prison, private household, palace, castle, or other institution. Often proprietary churches and small conventual churches are referred to by this term. A number of Roman Catholic and Evangelical-Lutheran churches have side chapels that are used for prayer, and/or are dedicated for specific purposes, e.g. the normative place that baptisms are held in the church.

=== Collegiate church ===
A collegiate church is a church where the daily office of worship is maintained by a college of canons, which may be presided over by a dean or provost. Collegiate churches were often supported by extensive lands held by the church, or by tithe income from appropriated benefices. They commonly provide distinct spaces for congregational worship and for the choir offices of their clerical community.

=== Conventual church ===
A conventual church (in Eastern Orthodoxy katholikon) is the main church in a Christian monastery or convent, known variously as an abbey, a priory, a friary, or a preceptory.

=== Parish church ===
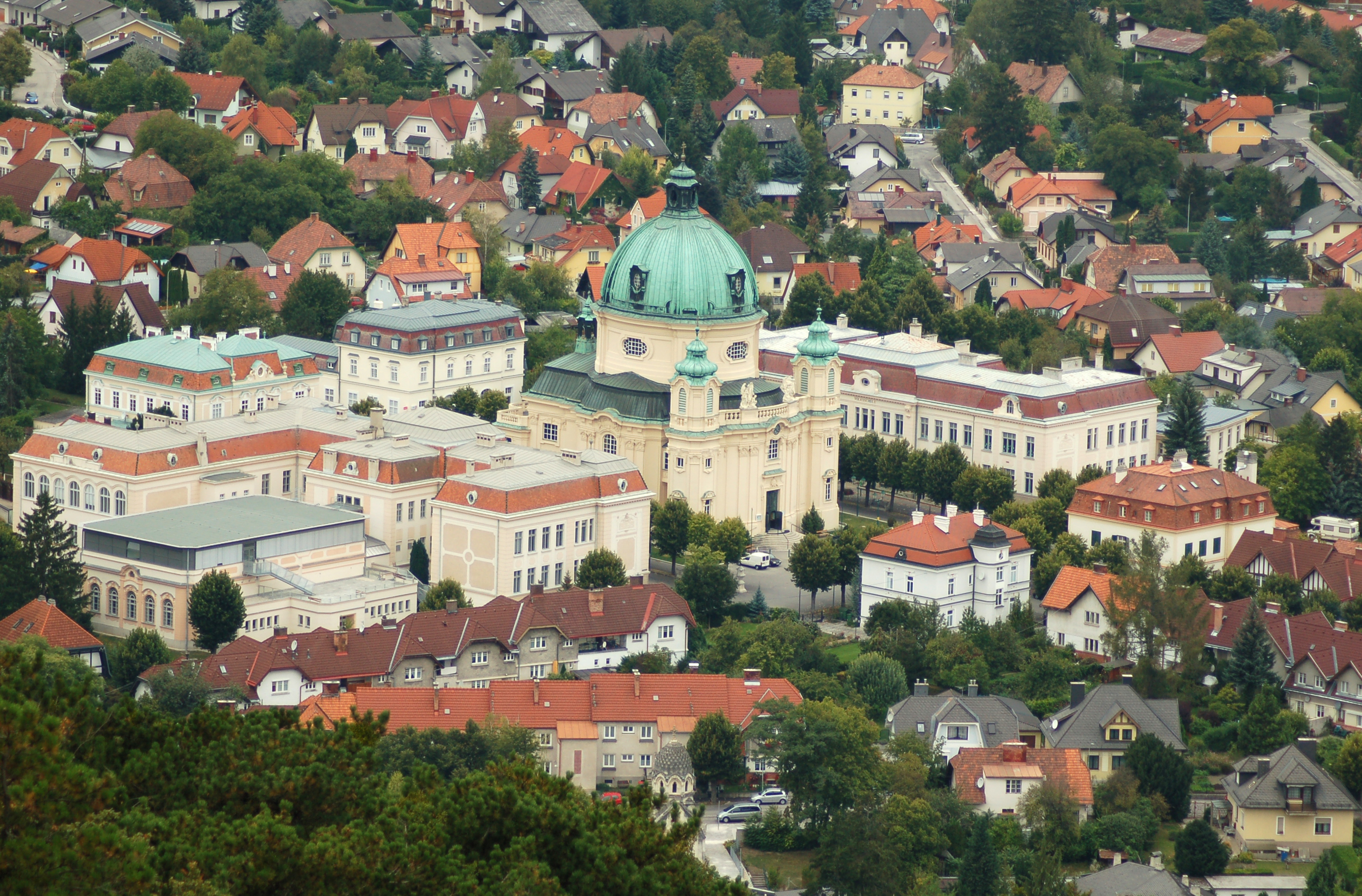
St Margarete Parish Church, Berndorf, Austria

A parish church is a church built to meet the needs of people localised in a geographical area called a parish. The vast majority of Catholic, Orthodox, Anglican, and Lutheran church buildings fall into this category. A parish church may also be a basilica, a cathedral, a conventual or collegiate church, or a place of pilgrimage. The vast majority of parish churches do not however enjoy such privileges.

In addition to a parish church, each parish may maintain auxiliary organizations and their facilities such as a rectory, parish hall, parochial school, or convent, frequently located on the same campus or adjacent to the church.

=== Pilgrimage church ===
A pilgrimage church is a church to which pilgrimages are regularly made, or a church along a pilgrimage route, often located at the tomb of a saints, or holding icons or relics to which miraculous properties are ascribed, the site of Marian apparitions, etc.

=== Proprietary church ===
During the Middle Ages, a proprietary church was a church, abbey, or cloister built on the private grounds of a feudal lord, over which he retained proprietary interests.

=== Churchhouse and Meetinghouse ===
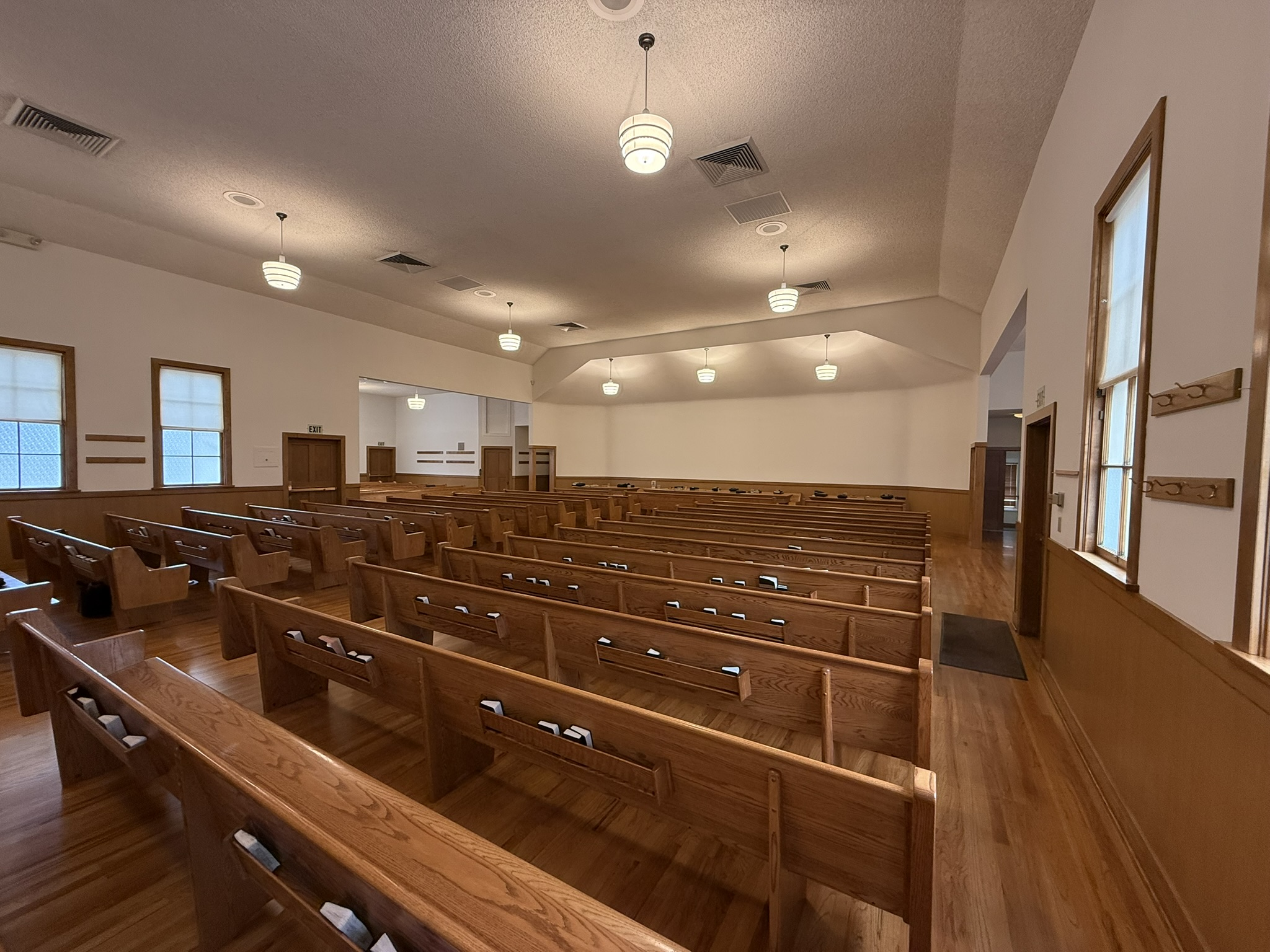
The meetinghouse of the Modesto Congeragation of the Old German Baptist Brethren Church, New Conference in Modesto, California

The term "meetinghouse" (also called a "churchhouse") has been employed by a number of Old Order Anabaptist and Conservative Anabaptist fellowships, as well as in the Quaker tradition. The term "meetinghouse", as well as "chapel" was employed to refer to houses of worship in the Methodist tradition, though at present, the term "church" is normative.

=== House church ===
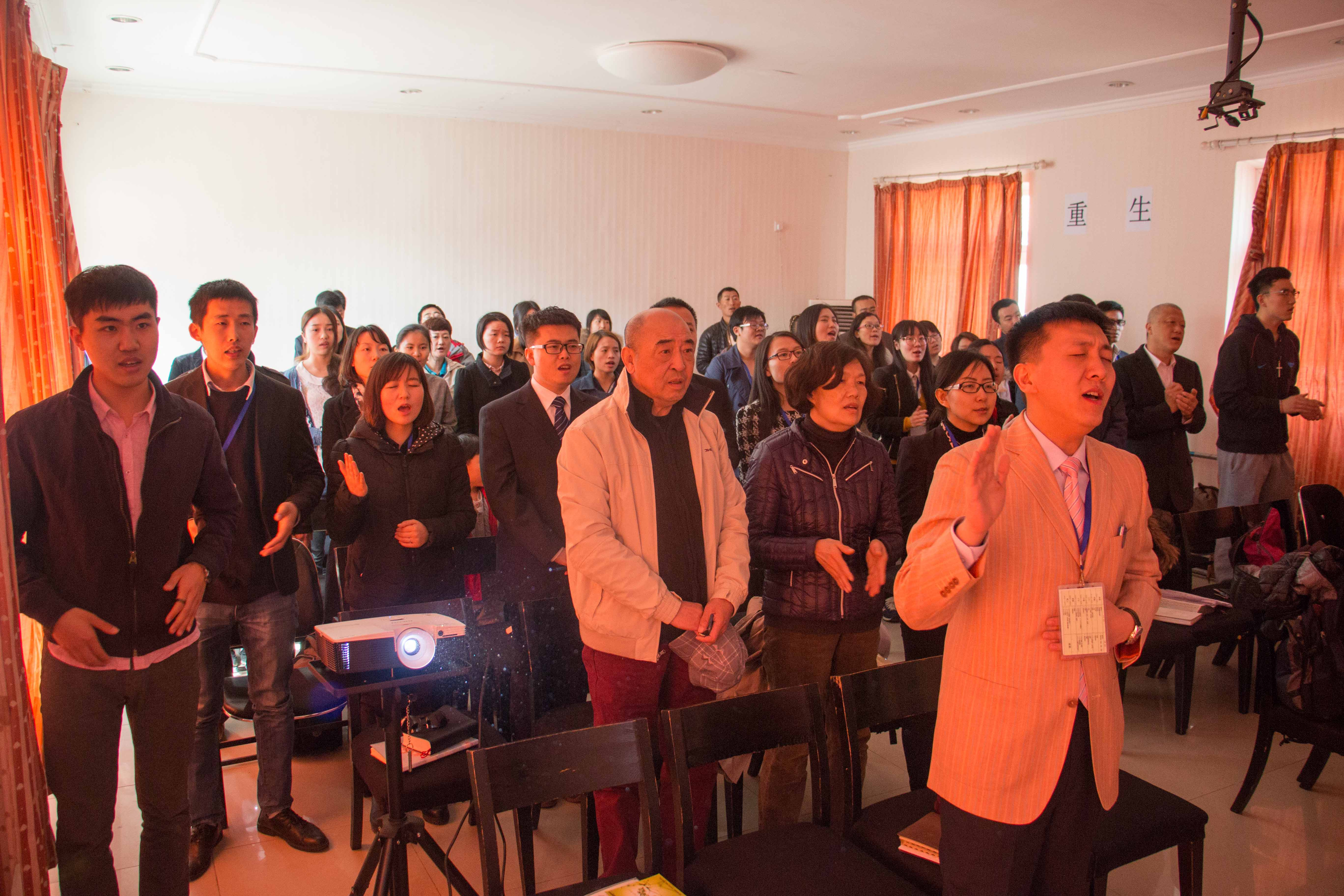
A house church in Shunyi, Beijing

In some countries of the world which apply sharia or communism, government authorizations for worship are complex for Christians. Because of persecution of Christians, Evangelical house churches have thus developed. For example, there is the Evangelical house churches in China movement. The meetings thus take place in private houses, in secret and in "illegality".

=== Megachurch ===
A church in which more than 2,000 people gather each Sunday is known as a megachurch. The term gigachurch is sometimes used to refer to especially large megachurches, such as Lakewood Church (United States) or Yoido Full Gospel Church (South Korea).

=== Alternative buildings ===
Old and disused church buildings can be seen as an interesting proposition for developers as the architecture and location often provide for attractive homes or city centre entertainment venues. On the other hand, many newer churches have decided to host meetings in public buildings such as schools, universities, cinemas or theatres.

There is another trend to convert old buildings for worship rather than face the construction costs and planning difficulties of a new build. Unusual venues in the UK include a former tram power station, a former bus garage, a former cinema and bingo hall, a former Territorial Army drill hall, and a former synagogue. HMS Tees served as a floating church for mariners at Liverpool from 1827 until she sank in 1872. A windmill has also been converted into a church at Reigate Heath.

== Management and maintenance ==
A parochial church council in the Church of England is responsible for the maintenance of the churches and church halls under its jurisdiction.

The Catholic Church directs priests in parishes to ensure that

The house of prayer in which the Most Holy Eucharist is celebrated and reserved, where the faithful gather and where the presence of the Son of God, our Savior, offered for us on the altar of sacrifice bestows strength and blessings on the faithful, [is kept] spotless and suitable for prayer and sacred functions.

Several partnerships have been established involving church management and private real estate companies to redevelop church properties into mixed uses. While they have garnered criticism, these partnerships allow congregations to increase revenue while preserving the property.

== Geographical distribution ==
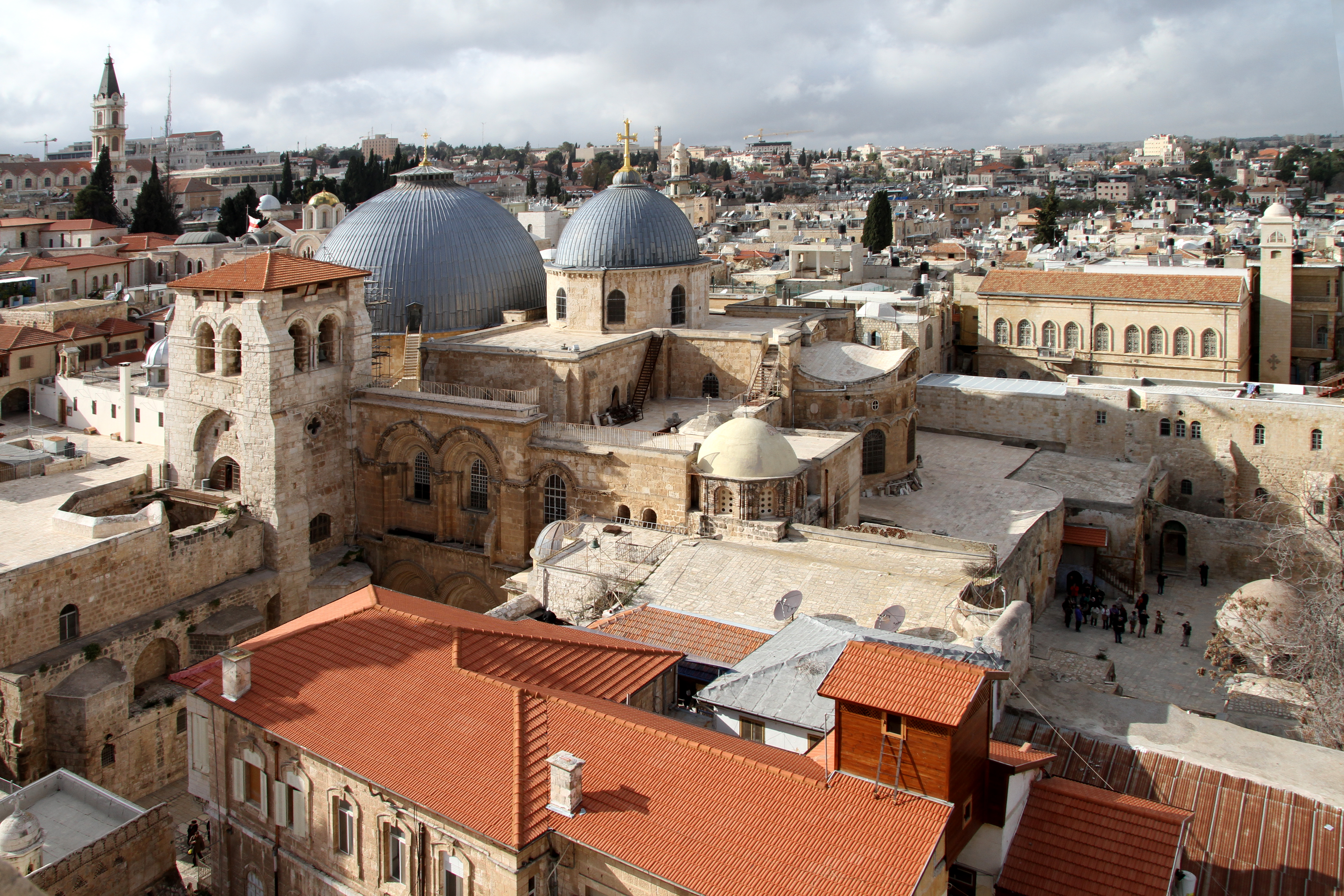
Church of the Holy Sepulchre is considered the most important church in all of Christendom.

With the exception of Saudi Arabia and the Maldives, all sovereign states and dependent territories worldwide have church buildings. Afghanistan has the fewest churches globally, featuring only one official church: the Our Lady of Divine Providence Chapel in Kabul. Somalia follows closely, having once housed the Mogadishu Cathedral, along with the Saint Anthony of Padua Church in Somaliland. Other countries with a limited number of churches include Bhutan and Western Sahara. (Note: In Bhutan, 65,000 Christians have access to only one official church. In Western Sahara, however, there are dozens of Moroccan Christians and around 260 expatriate Spaniards who are served by two churches: St. Francis of Assisi Cathedral in Laayoune and Our Lady of Mount Carmel Church in Dakhla.)

In contrast, some estimates suggest that the United States has the highest number of churches in the world, with around 380,000, followed by Brazil and Italy. According to the Future for Religious Heritage, there are over 500,000 churches across Europe. Several cities are commonly known as the "City of Churches" due to their abundance of churches. These cities include Adelaide, Ani, Ayacucho, Kraków, Moscow, Montreal, Naples, Ohrid, Prague, Puebla, Querétaro, Rome, Salzburg, and Vilnius. Notably, Rome and New York City are home to the highest number of churches of any city in the world.

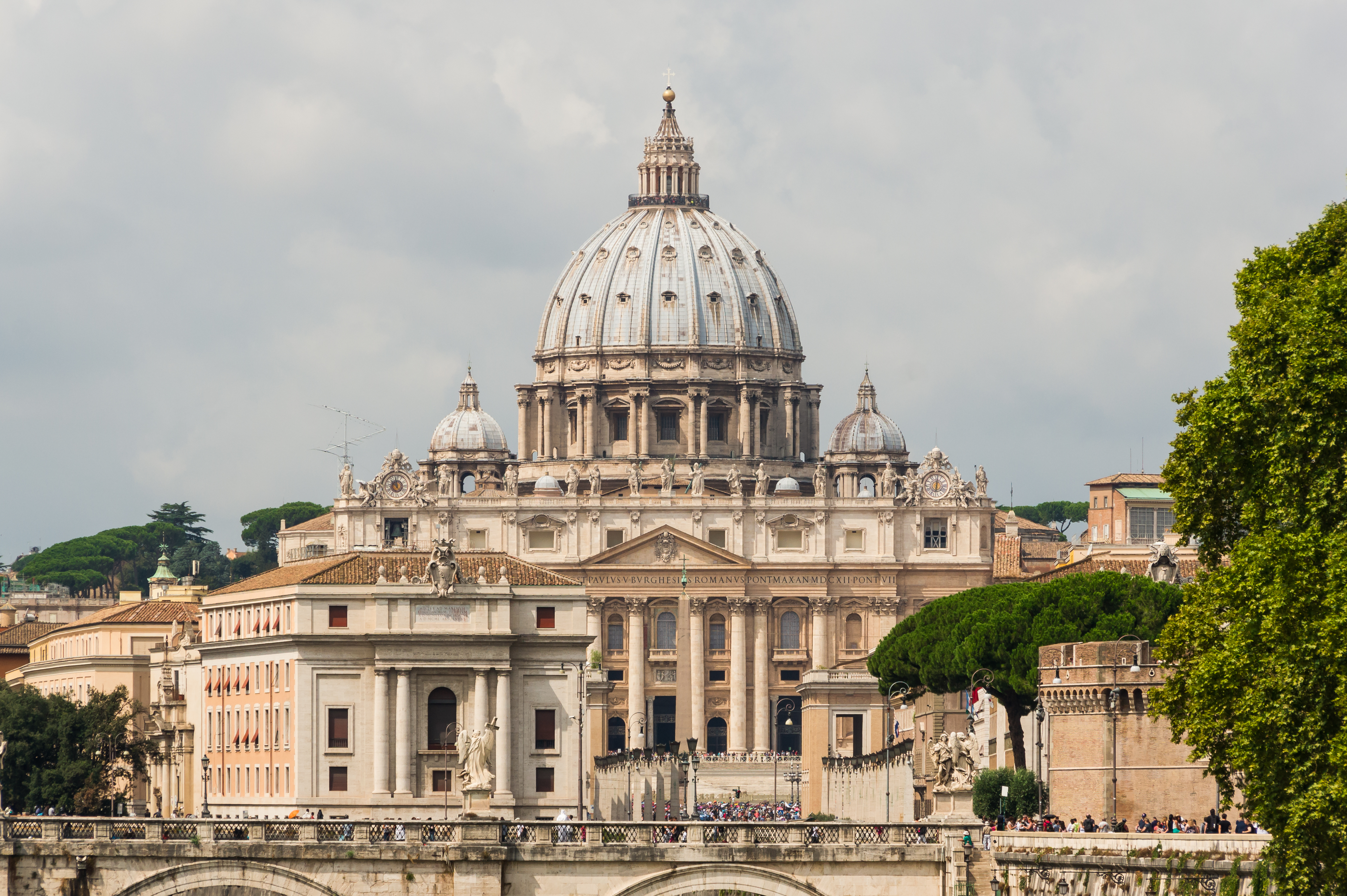
St. Peter's Basilica in Vatican City, the largest church in the world

Although building churches is prohibited in Saudi Arabia, which has around 1.5 million Christians, the country contains the remnants of a historic church known as the Jubail Church, which dates back to the fourth century and was affiliated with the Church of the East. Discovered in 1986, the site was excavated by the Saudi Antiquities Department in 1987. As of 2008, the findings from this excavation had not been published, reflecting sensitivities regarding artifacts from non-Islamic religions. In the Maldives, which has approximately 1,400 Christians, building churches is prohibited. However, only foreign Christian workers are allowed to practice their religion privately. Despite the prohibition on church construction, both countries have secret home churches.

Christianity is the world's largest and most widespread religion, with over 2.3 billion followers. Churches are found across all seven continents (Asia, Africa, North America, South America, Antarctica, Europe, and Oceania). Antarctica is home to eight churches, with two additional churches located south of the Antarctic Convergence.

Many churches worldwide are of considerable historical, national, cultural, and architectural significance, with several recognized as UNESCO World Heritage Sites. According to the Catholic Encyclopedia the Cenacle (the site of the Last Supper) in Jerusalem was the "first Christian church". The Dura-Europos church in Syria is the oldest surviving church building in the world. Several authors have cited the Etchmiadzin Cathedral (Armenia's mother church) as the oldest cathedral in the world.

== See also ==
- Dedication
- List of largest church buildings
- Pub church
- Shrine
- Tabernacle (Methodist)
- Temple

== Bibliography ==
- Levy, Patricia (2004). Cathedrals and the Church. Medieval World. North Mankato, MN: Smart Apple Media. ISBN 1-58340-572-0.
- Krieger, Herman (1998). Churches ad hoc. PhotoZone Press. ISBN 9780966580969.
- Erlande-Brandenburg, Alain, Qu'est-ce qu'une église ?, Gallimard, Paris, 333 p., 2010.
- Gendry Mickael, L'église, un héritage de Rome, Essai sur les principes et méthodes de l'architecture chrétienne, Religions et Spiritualité, collection Beaux-Arts architecture religion, édition Harmattan 2009, 267 p.
