= Catholic Church in Western Sahara =

Catholic missionary jurisdiction in Africa

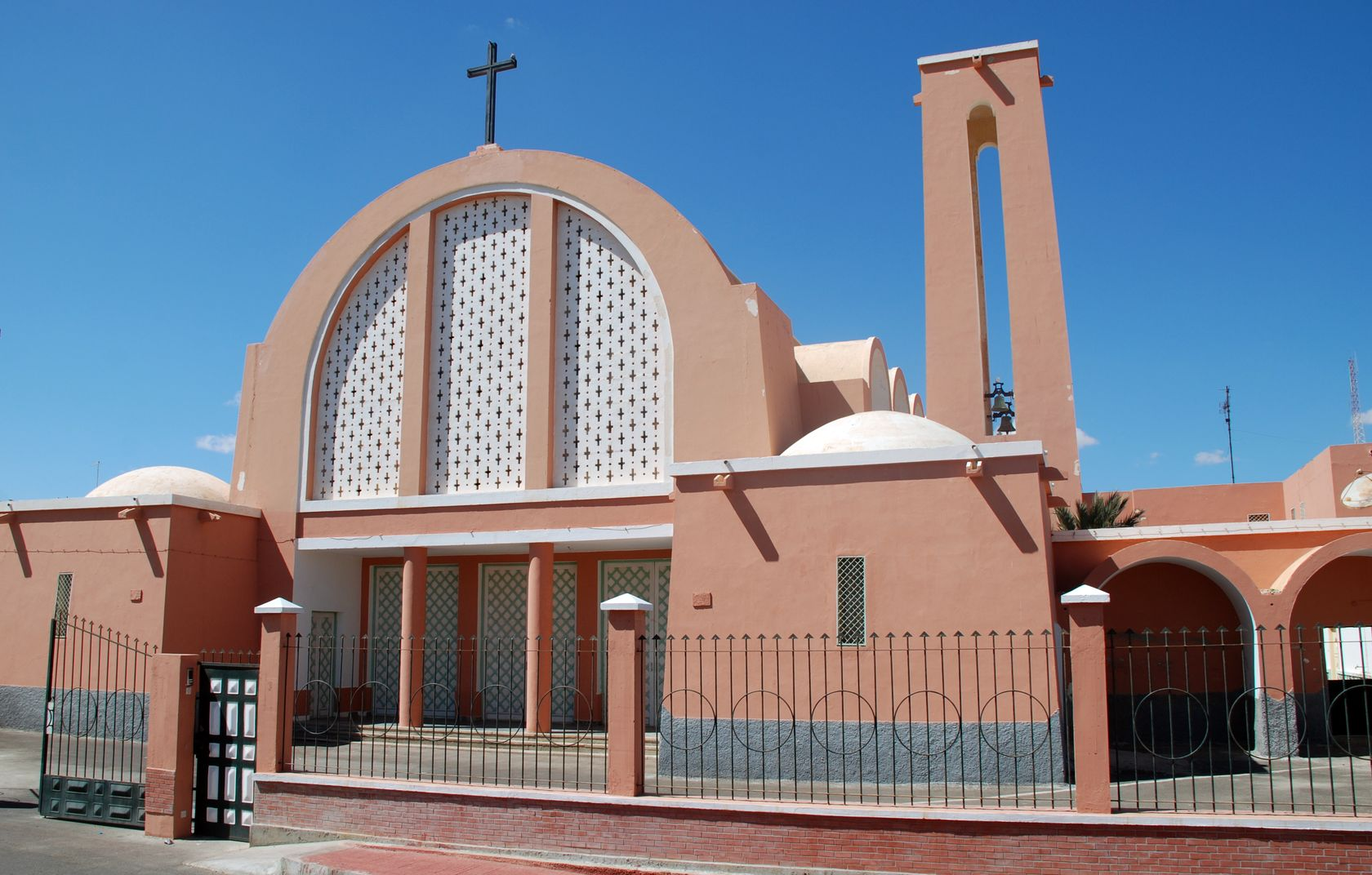
St. Francis of Assisi Cathedral, Laayoune

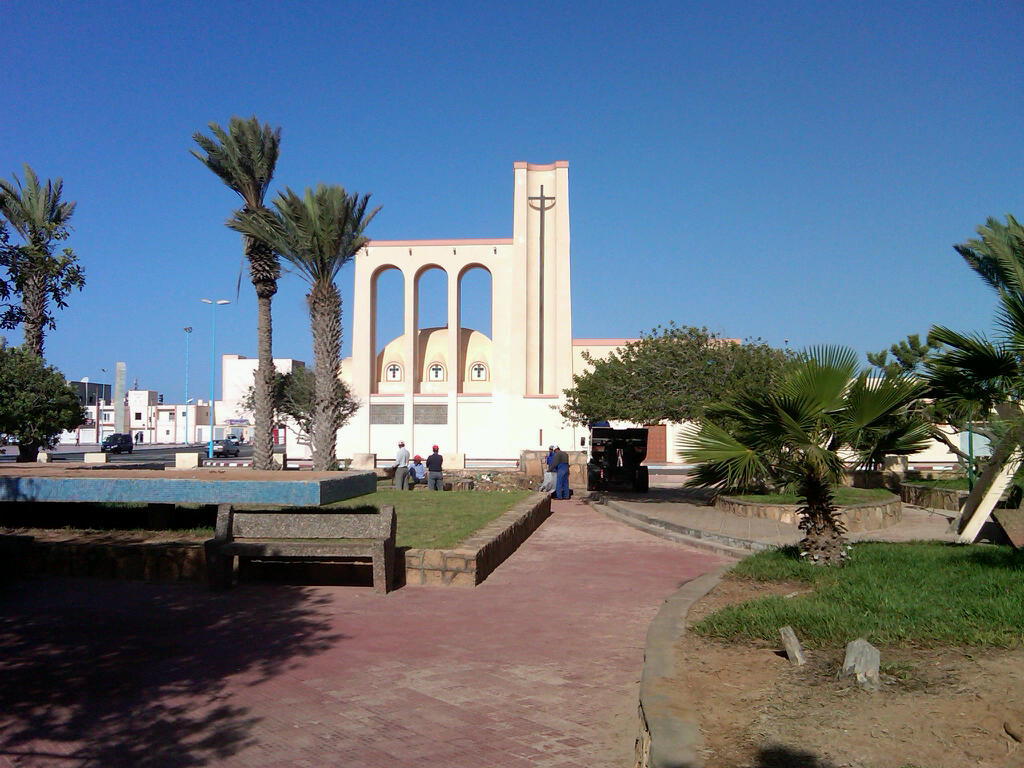
Our Lady of Mount Carmel Church, Dakhla

The Catholic Church in Western Sahara is part of the worldwide Catholic Church (particularly the Latin Church), under the spiritual leadership of the Pope in Rome.

== History ==
Western Sahara is a former Spanish colony, and the Catholic faith was introduced via Spanish colonialism and prior Portuguese exploration. Prior to Spain's abandoning the country in 1975, there were over 20,000 Spanish Catholics, who formed roughly 32% of the total population before the Moroccan occupation.

Western Sahara is one of the most religiously homogeneous nations in the world. The World Factbook estimates put the indigenous population to be entirely Muslim. The Christian community is largely composed of around 260 expatriate Spaniards out of a resident population of over 587,000.

There are no dioceses in the country, with the entire country forming a single apostolic prefecture, originally administered by the Apostolic Prefecture of Spanish Sahara and Ifni which was founded on July 5, 1954. It was later renamed as the Apostolic Prefecture of Spanish Sahara on May 2, 1970, and subsequently as the Apostolic Prefecture of Western Sahara on May 2, 1976. There are 2 parishes, 2 religious priests and 2 lay religious brothers as of 2014.

Only three Apostolic Prefects have overseen the territory since 1954: Félix Erviti Barcelona, from July 19, 1954, until his retirement on July 6, 1994, Acacio Valbuena Rodríguez from July 10, 1994, until his retirement in 2009, and the Apostolic Prefect-elect, Mario León Dorado OMI, appointed by Pope Francis on June 24, 2013, who had formerly been Chief of the Apostolic Prefecture.

== Apostolic Prefectures ==
- Catholic Apostolic Prefecture of West Sahara

== Cathedrals ==
- Spanish Cathedral in El-Aaiún, Western Sahara (Catholic Apostolic Prefecture of West Sahara)
- Spanish cathedral in Dakhla. Western Sahara
