= Mario León Dorado =

Spanish Roman Catholic prelate (born 1974)

The Reverend Mario León Dorado
- Coadjutor Archbishop of Rabat
- Church: Catholic Church
- See: Rabat
- Appointed: 12 September 2026
- Predecessor: Acacio Valbuena Rodríguez

Orders
- Ordination: 2 June 2001

Personal details
- Born: 16 March 1974 (age 52) Madrid, Spanish State

Mario León Dorado, O.M.I. (born 16 March 1974) is a Spanish Roman Catholic prelate, in the Oblates of Mary Immaculate. He is currently the Apostolic prefect of Western Sahara, and Coadjutor archbishop of archdiocese of Rabat since September 2026.

== Early life ==
Mario León Dorado was born in Madrid, Spain on 17 March 1974. As he grew up, he decided that he wanted to undertake missionary work, taking his vows on 15 September 1996. He was later ordained as priest on 2 June 2001, and served for three years in the Province of Jaén in Spain, with a desire to be posted to a ministry in an Arabic region afterwards. This was following a visit to the Sahara area as a student.

== Western Sahara ==
Upon the completion of the Jaén posting, he moved to the Sahara region and began to learn Arabic, French and English in order to better serve his parishioners. When he first arrived in the area, he was taken for a walk by Fr. Acacio Valbuena Rodríguez and told "these are your parishioners, all Muslims. Being with them is what you have to do". On 24 June 2013, he was appointed by Pope Francis as Apostolic prefect of Western Sahara, prefecture of which he had been the administrator since the resignation of Rodríguez in 2009. He took possession of the position on 29 September, at a celebration at St. Francis of Assisi Cathedral, Laayoune. León Dorado is the third Apostolic prefect of the region, following Rodríguez and Félix Erviti Barcelona.

León Dorado described Christians in Western Sahara as being equivalent to foreigners, since there were around 600 in a total population of around 800,000 in the country. He serves two churches; the Catheral in Laayoune and a church in Dakhla, as well as a chapel in the port of Laayoune.

Catholic Church titles
Preceded by Acacio Valbuena Rodríguez	Apostolic prefect of Western Sahara; 2013–present	Succeeded by Incumbent
