= Erviti =

Erviti is a surname. Notable people with the surname include:

- Félix Erviti Barcelona (1910–2000), Spanish Roman Catholic priest
- Imanol Erviti (born 1983), Spanish road bicycle racer
- Walter Erviti (born 1980), Argentine footballer
