= Acacio Valbuena Rodríguez =

- O.M.I.
- Church: Catholic Church
- See: Apostolic Prefecture of Western Sahara
- In office: 10 July 1994 – 25 February 2009
- Predecessor: Félix Erviti Barcelona
- Successor: Mario León Dorado

Orders
- Ordination: 17 March 1945

Personal details
- Born: 8 May 1922 Horcadas, Riaño, León, Kingdom of Spain
- Died: 4 May 2011 (aged 88) Madrid, Spain

Fr. Acacio Valbuena Rodríguez (8 May 1922 – 4 May 2011) was the Roman Catholic Prefect for Western Sahara. He was ordained as priest in the Oblates of Mary Immaculate on 17 March 1945, and on July 10, 1994, John Paul II installed him in the Apostolic Prefecture of Western Sahara. Rodríguez had an audience with Pope Benedict XVI in Rome on 8 June 2007. Fr. Rodríguez has also attended the Assembly of the Conference of Bishops of North Africa. He lived in El Aaiún. On 25 February 2009, Pope Benedict XVI accepted the resignation of Fr. Rodríguez as Apostolic prefect of Western Sahara for age reasons.

| Preceded by Félix Erviti Barcelona as Apostolic prefect of Spanish Sahara and Ifni (1954–1970); Apostolic prefect of Spanish Sahara (1970–1976); Apostolic prefect of Western Sahara (1976–1994) | Apostolic prefect of Western Sahara; 1994–2009 | Succeeded by Mario León Dorado |
