= Our Lady of Mount Carmel Church, Dakhla =

Building in Western Sahara

Coordinates: 23°42′05.04″N 15°55′41.16″W

Our Lady of Mount Carmel Church Iglesia de Nuestra Señora del Carmen
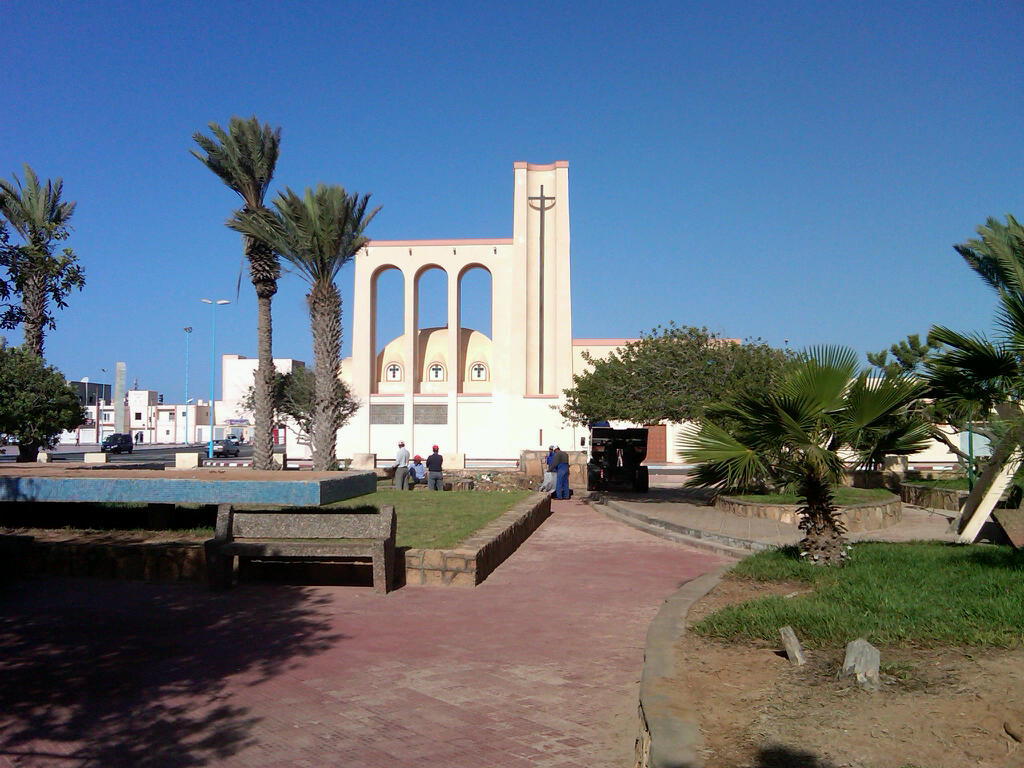
- Our Lady of Mount Carmel Church

Religion
- Affiliation: Roman Catholic Church
- Rite: Roman
- Ecclesiastical or organisational status: Cathedral
- Status: Active

Location
- Location: Dakhla, Morocco
- Interactive map of Our Lady of Mount Carmel Church; Iglesia de Nuestra Señora del Carmen

Architecture
- Type: church

The Our Lady of Mount Carmel Church (Spanish: Iglesia de Nuestra Señora del Carmen French: Eglise de Notre Dame du Mont-Carmel) alternatively Church of Dakhla or simply Church of Villa Cisneros is a Roman Catholic parish church located in the town of Dakhla (called before 1975 Villa Cisneros) located in the territory of Western Sahara in dispute with Morocco and is considered by the latter nation as part of the region of Dakhla-Oued Ed-Dahab (الداخلة - وادي الذهب or région de Dakhla-Oued Ed Dahab).

The temple follows the Roman or Latin Rite. It is part of the apostolic prefecture of Western Sahara (Praefectura Apostolica Sahara Occidentali). This prefecture was established in 1954 by Pope Pius XII with the bull Summi Dei voluntate with the name of Apostolic Prefecture of the Spanish Sahara, because by then the territory was a colonial dependency of Spain.

The temple is run by a small group of priests who take turns responsibilities to attend this church, besides the Cathedral of St. Francis of Assisi in Laayoune. It was built by the Spaniards for what sometimes is called Spanish Church.

== See also ==
- Catholic Church in Western Sahara
- Catholic Church in Morocco
