= City of Churches =

Name of several churches

Cities known as City of Churches include:

== Europe ==
- Salzburg, Austria
- Bristol, England
- Norwich, England
- Kraków, Poland

== United States ==
- Birmingham, Alabama
- Berkeley, California
- Titusville, Florida
- Evanston, Illinois
- Fort Wayne, Indiana
- Brooklyn, New York
- Charlotte, North Carolina
- Danville, Virginia

== Elsewhere ==
- Adelaide, Australia
- Ayacucho, Peru
- Intramuros, Manila, Philippines

== See also ==
- City of Spires
- Oxford, England, known as the "city of dreaming spires"
