= St. Francis of Assisi Cathedral, Laayoune =

Church in Laayoune, Western Sahara

St. Francis of Assisi Cathedral Spanish Cathedral
- Catedral de San Francisco de Asís; Cathédrale de Saint François d'Assise
- كاتدرائية القديس فرنسيس الأسيزي
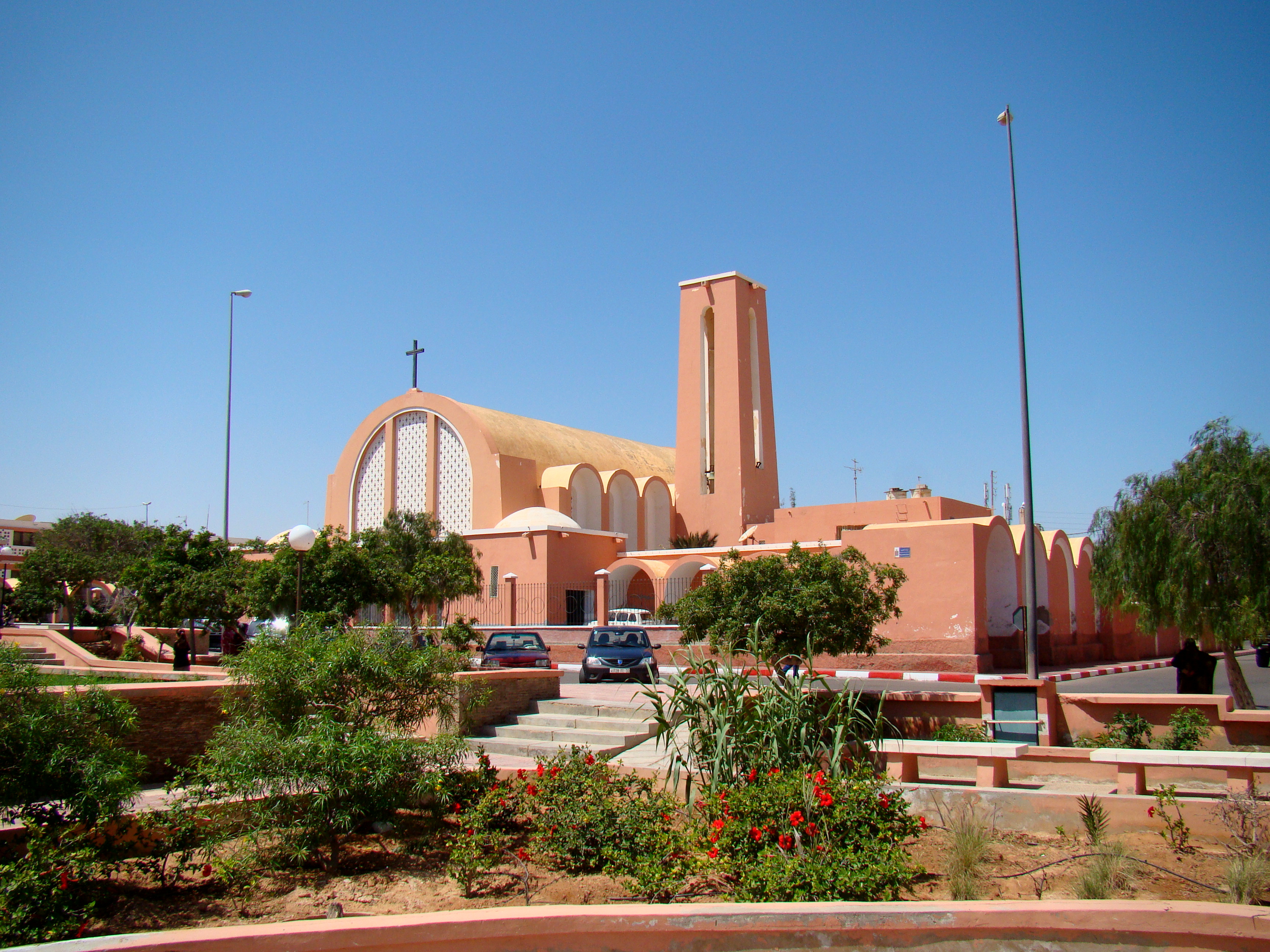
- St. Francis of Assisi Cathedral; Spanish Cathedral
- Location: Laayoune (El Aaiún)
- Country: Western Sahara; Disputed by SADR; Morocco
- Denomination: Roman Catholic Church

History
- Status: Cathedral

Architecture
- Architectural type: Church

The St. Francis of Assisi Cathedral (Spanish: Catedral de San Francisco de Asís de El Aaiún; French: Cathédrale de Saint François d'Assise) or just Spanish Cathedral, is a Roman Catholic church that serves as the cathedral church of the apostolic prefecture of Western Sahara (Praefectura Apostolica de Sahara Occidentali). It is located in the city of Laayoune (El Aaiún), Western Sahara, a territory that is in dispute between Morocco and the Sahrawi Arab Democratic Republic, and occupied by the former.

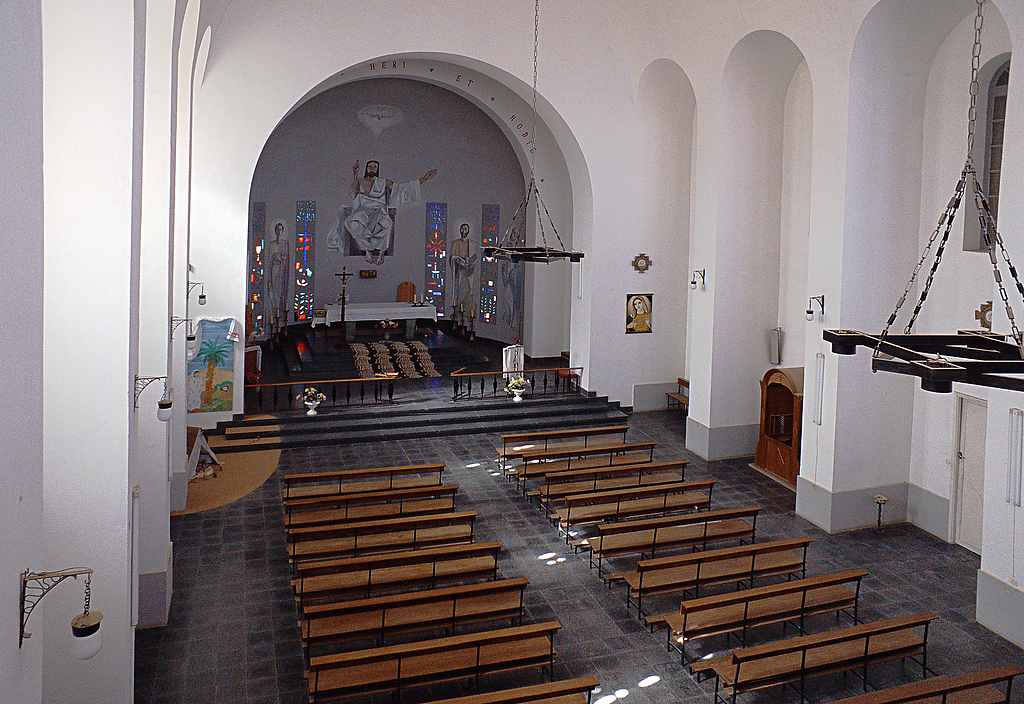
Internal view

The church was built in 1954, during the Spanish colonial presence in Spanish Sahara with the design of architect Diego Méndez, author of the project of "Valley of the Fallen" in San Lorenzo de El Escorial in Spain. Today, the cathedral is in the charge of the Oblates of Mary Immaculate and serves the small Spanish community in the city that is still present, as well as serving active personnel of the UN mission in the country.

== See also ==
- Roman Catholicism in Western Sahara
