= Félix Erviti Barcelona =

Spanish Roman Catholic priest (1910–2000)

Félix Erviti Barcelona O.M.I.
- Prefect of Western Sahara
- Native name: Félix Erbiti Barcelona
- Church: Catholic Church
- See: Apostolic Prefecture of Western Sahara
- In office: 19 July 1954 – 6 July 1994
- Predecessor: Prefecture erected
- Successor: Acacio Valbuena Rodríguez

Orders
- Ordination: 19 February 1933

Personal details
- Born: 29 July 1910 Valcarlos, Navarre, Kingdom of Spain
- Died: 24 November 2000 (aged 90) Madrid, Spain

Félix Erviti Barcelona (29 July 1910 – 24 November 2000) was a Spanish Roman Catholic priest, in the Oblates of Mary Immaculate. He was ordained as priest on February 19, 1933.

== Religious life ==
He was appointed by Pope Pius XII as the first apostolic prefect of Spanish Sahara and Ifni on July 19, 1954. The Apostolic Prefecture of Spanish Sahara and Ifni was formed by ripping out and merging territories that had earlier been under the purview of the apostolic vicariates in Morocco and Algeria. He served as the apostolic prefect of Western Sahara until May 2, 1994, when he was succeeded by Acacio Valbuena Rodríguez, although he remained as Prefect Emeritus of Western Sahara. He also served as a deputy member of the Conferencia Episcopal Española's first triennium in the 1966–1969 period and as a member in the second triennium between 1969 and 1972.

== Later life ==
He was involved in running a school and a hospital in Laayoune. After the 1975 occupation of Western Sahara by Morocco, the Catholic population of the prefecture went down from 22515 to 368, and the prefecture was renamed as the Prefecture of Western Sahara with just two parishes and three religious people. Erviti then spent 19 years working towards the betterment of the refugees in the Sahrawi refugee camps while cooperating with the United Nations Mission for the Referendum in Western Sahara (MINURSO). Pope John Paul II accepted his resignation in 1994 due to reasons of old age, and he retired to the provincial house of his order in Madrid. He died while celebrating mass at the Parroquia Virgen Peregrina de Fátima, in Madrid.

New office	Apostolic prefect of Spanish Sahara and Ifni (1954–1970); Apostolic prefect of Spanish Sahara (1970–1976); Apostolic prefect of Western Sahara (1976–1994)	Succeeded by Acacio Valbuena Rodríguez
