= Sufyan Rajab =

Tunisian writer (born 1979)

- سفيان رجب
- Born: 1979 (age 46–47); Enfidha
- Occupation: Writer
- Writing career
- Language: Arabic
- Notable work: The Liberal Monkey The American Shoe Factory
- Notable awards: 2007 Moufdi Zakaria Award (Algeria); 2009 Tanga's Award for Poetry; Afifi Mattar Award

Sufyan Rajab (سفيان رجب) (born 1979) is a Tunisian writer born in Enfidha. He began his career as a poet, moving later on to storytelling.

== Career ==
Rajab has a number of publications including critique articles, poetry, and novels.

He has published various poems in significant Arab newspapers, in addition to critique articles in the London newspaper The Arabs, the UAE Cultural Magazine and Life's cultural magazine.

Furthermore, he is known to be mentioned in significant files in Tunisian literature, such as in books published by the University of Oregon in 2015, joint books between the National Institute for Translation and the Federation of Italian Writers in 2017, along with files prepared by the Swedish magazine Caravan in 2018.

Moving from poetry to storytelling, The Liberal Monkey (2017) was his first novel, following up with his second one, The American Shoe Factory (2021), which discusses terrorism and the adaptation of new ruling systems

Additionally, his short story collection, The Last Hour (2018), was shortlisted for the Form Story Award 2019 in Kuwait.

== List of Publications ==
Works	Publication Date
Like an Orange above a Poor One's Table (Poetry)	2012
The Fenced Garden (Poetry)	2013
Our Peculiar Neighbour's Window (Poetry)	2016
The Liberal Monkey (Novel)	2017
Zoo (Article)	2017
Trees Among Wind (Poetry)	2017
The Final Hour (Short Story Collection)	2018
The Air Postman (Poetry)	2019
People of the Red Book (Short Story Collection)	2020
The Idea of Light (Article)	2020
Taboo Forest (Article)	2020
Personal Right Case Against Plato (Article)	2021
The American Shoe Factory (Novel)	2021

== Awards ==
Rajab won various local and Arab poetry awards, including:

- 2007 Moufdi Zakaria Award (Algeria)
- 2009 Tanga's Award for Poetry
- 2018 Afifi Mattar Award for his collection of poetries, The Air Postman

== See also ==
- Storytelling
- Poetry
