= Cristóbal López Romero =

Spanish Catholic cardinal

His Eminence Cristóbal López Romero S.D.B.
- Archbishop of Rabat
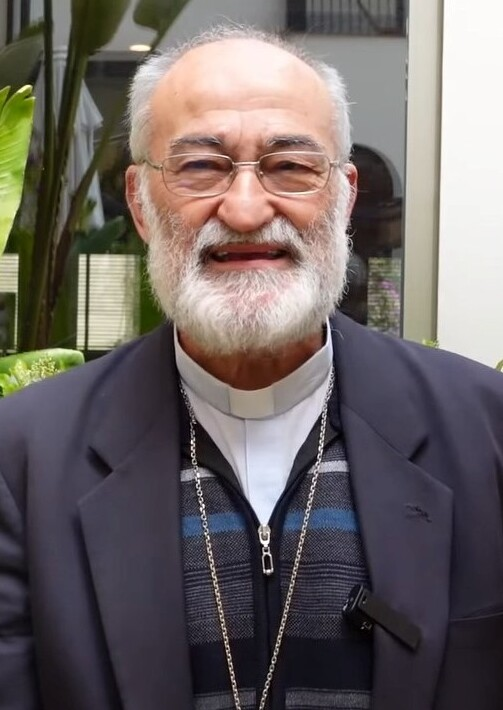
- Church: Catholic Church
- Archdiocese: Rabat
- See: Rabat
- Appointed: 29 December 2017
- Installed: 10 March 2018
- Predecessor: Vincent Louis Marie Landel
- Other posts: Apostolic Administrator of Tanger (2019-); Cardinal-Priest of San Leone I (2019-)

Orders
- Ordination: 19 May 1979 by Narciso Jubany Arnau
- Consecration: 10 March 2018 by Juan José Omella
- Created cardinal: 5 October 2019 by Pope Francis
- Rank: Cardinal-Priest

Personal details
- Born: Cristóbal López Romero; 19 May 1952 (age 74) Vélez-Rubio, Spain
- Education: Autonomous University of Barcelona
- Motto: Adveniat regnum Tuum (Thy kingdom come)
- Coat of arms

Cristóbal López Romero SDB (born 19 May 1952) is a Spanish prelate of the Catholic Church who has served as the Archbishop of Rabat since 2018. He is a member of the Salesians and before becoming a bishop was devoted to pastoral work in Latin America and administrative responsibilities in his order. Pope Francis made him a cardinal in 2019. He was accused of sexual misconduct by five women in 2026.

== Biography ==
=== Early life and studies ===
Cristóbal López Romero was born on 19 May 1952 in Vélez-Rubio, Spain. He joined the Salesians in 1964 and studied at the Salesian Seminaries of Gerona and Barcelona, studying philosophy from 1973 to 1975 and theology from 1975 to 1979. He earned a licenciate in information sciences, Journalism section, at the Autonomous University of Barcelona in 1982. He took his first vows as a Salesian on 16 August 1968 and made his solemn profession on 2 August 1974. He was ordained a priest on 19 May 1979.

His career has combined pastoral ministries with administrative positions within his order, mostly in Paraguay. From 1979 to 1984 he was minister for the marginalized in the La Verneda area of Barcelona; from 1984 to 1986 Youth Minister at the Salesian College of Asunción, Paraguay; from 1986 to 1992 Provincial Delegate for vocational youth ministry in Asunción; from 1992 to 1994 a parish priest in Asunción; from 2000 to 2002 head of the Salesian community and teacher in the College of Asunción; from 2002 to 2003 a minister in the missions in Paraguay.

He moved to Morocco in 2003, where he was director of the Salesian communityand led parish and scholastic pastoral care in the vocational training center in Kénitra.

Within his order, he was director of the Salesian Bulletin in Asunción from 1991 to 1992. He was provincial of the Salesian Province of Paraguay from 1994 to 2000; he headed the Salesian Province of Bolivia from 2011 to 2014. He then led the Salesian Province of María Auxiliadora in Spain.

=== Archbishop of Rabat ===
On 29 December 2017, Pope Francis named him Archbishop of Rabat. He received his episcopal consecration on 10 March 2018 from Cardinal Juan José Omella, Archbishop of Barcelona. Anticipating the visit of Pope Francis to Morocco in the spring of 2019, he described the Church in Morocco as "vibrant" and "young": "More young than old people come to our churches, more men than women, more black than white people." He emphasized its international character, caring for migrants from countries south of the Sahara with Church personnel drawn from more than forty countries.

On 24 May 2019, Pope Francis named him Apostolic Administrator of the Archdiocese of Tangier.

On 5 October 2019, Pope Francis made him a cardinal, assigning him to the order of cardinal priests with the title of San Leone I. On 8 December of that year López inaugurated the monastery of Tazert, a community of Franciscan nuns in his diocese. He was made a member of the Pontifical Council for Interreligious Dialogue on 21 February 2020. In 2022 he participated in a ceremony at the tombs of the monks of the monastery of Toumliline, which had held international interfaith dialogue conferences in the late 1950s and early 1960s.

In July 2026, Agence France-Presse rported that he was accused of sexual assault by five women, accusations he denied. He stepped down from his duties pending the outcome of a Vatican investigation.

== 2025 papal conclave ==
In 2025, the National Catholic Reporter described him as a "dark horse' candidate for election to succeed Pope Francis. Lopez participated as a cardinal elector in the 2025 papal conclave that elected Robert Francis Prevost as Pope Leo XIV.

== See also ==
- Cardinals created by Francis
- Catholic Church in Morocco

Catholic Church titles
| Preceded by Vincent Louis Marie Landel | Archbishop of Rabat; 29 December 2017 – | Incumbent |
| Preceded by Sergio Obeso Rivera | Cardinal-Priest of San Leone I 5 October 2019 – | Incumbent |
