= Uppenna =

Archaeological site in Tunisia

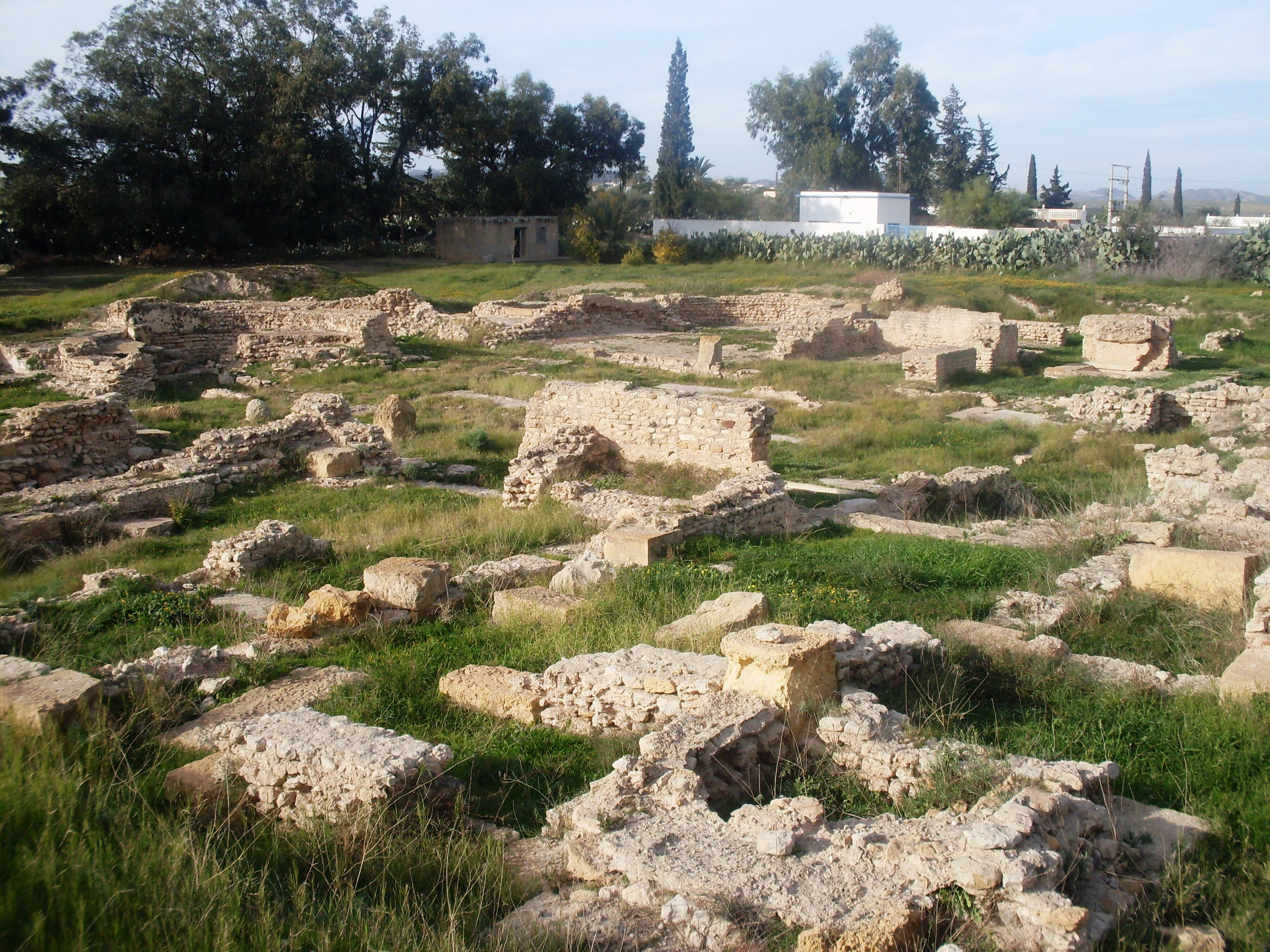
The ruins of Uppenna in Tunisia

Uppenna or Upenna is a Tunisian archaeological site located on the site of the present locality of Henchir Chigarnia. The site has revealed a basilica and the remains of a fortress.

== Location ==
The site is located at Henchir Fraga at 36°10'20.60"N, 10°24'50.22"E about 8 km north of Enfidaville, Tunisia.

== Archaeology ==
A Christian baptistery was cleared by René Cagnat in 1881. The fortress, classified March 25, 1889, was largely degraded thereafter. The discovery of 1881 was identified in 1901 by Paul Gauckler as belonging to a basilica. However, it is not exhaustively searched for budgetary reasons. The church may have been built atop the foundations of a demolished pagan temple.

The site was considered important by the excavators of the campaigns in 1904–1905, and focusing on this building allowed the discovery of about forty mosaics, the main one being a mosaic of martyrs which led to a major controversy between Gauckler and Dr. Louis Carton, reviving a conflict between the Antiquities Department and the Archaeological Society of Sousse. Indeed, the mosaic citing thirteen African martyred saints led to a debate on the place of the monument in the Donatist schism.

== Bishopric ==
Africa Proconsularis (125 AD)

The Diocese of Uppenna, is an ancient episcopal seat of the Roman province of Byzacena. The diocese was centered on a Roman town identifiable with Henchir-Medded in today's Tunisia.

- Titular bishop Jan De Bie of Belgium
- Titular archbishop Sergio Obeso Rivera (1974–1979)
- Titular archbishop Bernardo José Bueno Miele (1967–1972)
- Bishop Honorius, is attested in the archaeology, and may be the bishop of the same name known from the synod called in 484 by Huneric, the Vandal.
- Bishop Baleriolus, known only from a mosaic in the basilica

=== Basilica ===
Inscriptions in the church are dedicated to Bishops Honorius, and Baleriolus, a deacon Crescentius and the Presbyter Emeritus. The basilica had an eight lobed font.

The basilica was built to memorialize a group of local martyrs. A mosaic now housed in the Enfida Museum with a prominent cross and the list of martyrs was uncovered in the basilica. The local martyrs listed are Saturninus Bindemius, Saturninus Donatus, Saturninus Gududa, Paula, Clara, Lucilla, Fortunatus Lader, Cecillius, and Emilius.

Others commemorated in mosaics include Bishops Honorius and Baleriolus, a deacon Crescentius and the Presbyter Emeritus.

== See also ==
- Enfidha
