= Monastery of Tazert =

Franciscan monastery in Tazert, Morocco

Monastery of the Visitation
- Interactive map of Monastery of the Visitation

Monastery information
- Other name: Maison de la Visitation
- Order: Sisters of St. Francis of Assisi
- Established: 1931
- Mother house: Montpellier
- Diocese: Rabat

People
- Founder: Charles-André Poissonnier

Site
- Location: Tazert, El Kelâa des Sraghna Province, Morocco
- Coordinates: 31°38′05″N 7°25′45″W
- Public access: Yes

The monastery of Tazert is a Roman Catholic monastery in Tazert, Morocco. Originally founded by André Poissonnier, it is a priory of the Sisters of St. Francis of Assisi since 2019.

== History ==
The monastery was founded in 1931 by André Poissonnier who, inspired by the life of Charles de Foucauld and the Franciscan missionaries in Morocco, decided to live as a hermit in Tazert. For this, he set up a dispensary and a chapel where he lived as a hermit until his death due to typhus in 1938.

Poissonnier left the monastery to the Franciscans who continued to live in the monastery until the 1970s when a community of Poor Clares moved in. In order to be closer to the local population, they adopted the Melkite rite which is celebrated in Arabic. In 2013, these nuns under their hegumenia Mère Assunta retired to the Monastery of the Burning Bush in Carcassone as there were no longer enough sisters to ensure a presence.

The monastery then went over into the possession of the diocese of Rabat which started to search for a new monastic community to settle in Tazert. Finally, in late 2019, the Sisters of St. Francis of Assisi, a congregation whose motherhouse is located in Montpellier and who have also a presence in Mohammedia, sent a group of African nuns to Tazert. The inauguration took place on 8 December 2019 under participation of the archbishop of Rabat, Cristóbal López Romero.

Today the monastery serves as a place of prayer, offering spiritual retreat facilities with a guest house and educational opportunities for the surrounding Berber village of 3,500. As such, the nuns offer training in embroidery techniques as well as teaching literacy and computer science courses.

The monastery hosts interreligious dialogue sessions.

== See also ==
- Catholic Church in Morocco
- Monastery of Toumliline

== Sources ==
- Henning, Christophe (13 December 2019). "In Morocco, new life to Tazert monastery". La croix international. La Croix International.
- López, María Martínez (7 March 2020). "Un monasterio para hacer presente a la Iglesia en el Marruecos vaciado". Alfa y Omega (in Spanish).
- Zappa, Chiara (1 July 2022). "Morocco. Tazert. "Our doors are open to all"". www.southworld.net. SouthWorld.
- Zengarini, Lisa (18 December 2019). "Marocco: torna a nuova vita il Monastero della Visitazione di Tazert - Vatican News". www.vaticannews.va (in Italian).
