= Archdiocese of Rabat =

Catholic archdiocese in Morocco

Coordinates: 34.0333°N 6.8333°W

Archdiocese of Rabat Archidioecesis Rabatensis Archidiocèse de Rabat

Location
- Country: Morocco
- Territory: Rabat, northern Morocco

Statistics
- Population: Total; Catholics: (as of 2014); 28,860,000; 21,000 (.1%)

Information
- Denomination: Roman Catholic
- Rite: Roman Rite
- Established: 14 September 1955
- Cathedral: St. Peter's Cathedral

Current leadership
- Pope: Leo XIV
- Archbishop: Cristóbal López Romero
- Coadjutor: Mario León Dorado
- Vicar General: Daniel Nourissat
- Bishops emeritus: Vincent Landel

Map

Website
- www.dioceserabat.org

The Roman Catholic Archdiocese of Rabat (Latin: Archidioecesis Rabatensis) is an ecclesiastical territory or diocese of the Roman Catholic Church in Morocco. It was erected as the Apostolic Vicariate of Rabat on 2 July 1923, by Pope Pius XI, and promoted to the rank of an archdiocese by Pope Pius XII on 14 September 1955.

The archdiocese's mother church and seat of its archbishop is St. Peter's Cathedral, Rabat. Cristóbal López Romero, S.D.B. was appointed archbishop of Rabat on 29 December 2017.

== Role in society ==
In the 1950s, the bishop and most clergy were in favour of the country's independence, contrary to the vast majority of French colonialists. The bishops were also crucial in the foundation of monastic communities in Morocco. The monastery of Toumliline was founded by 20 Benedictine monks of the abbey of En-Calcat upon invitation of the bishop Louis Lefèbvre.

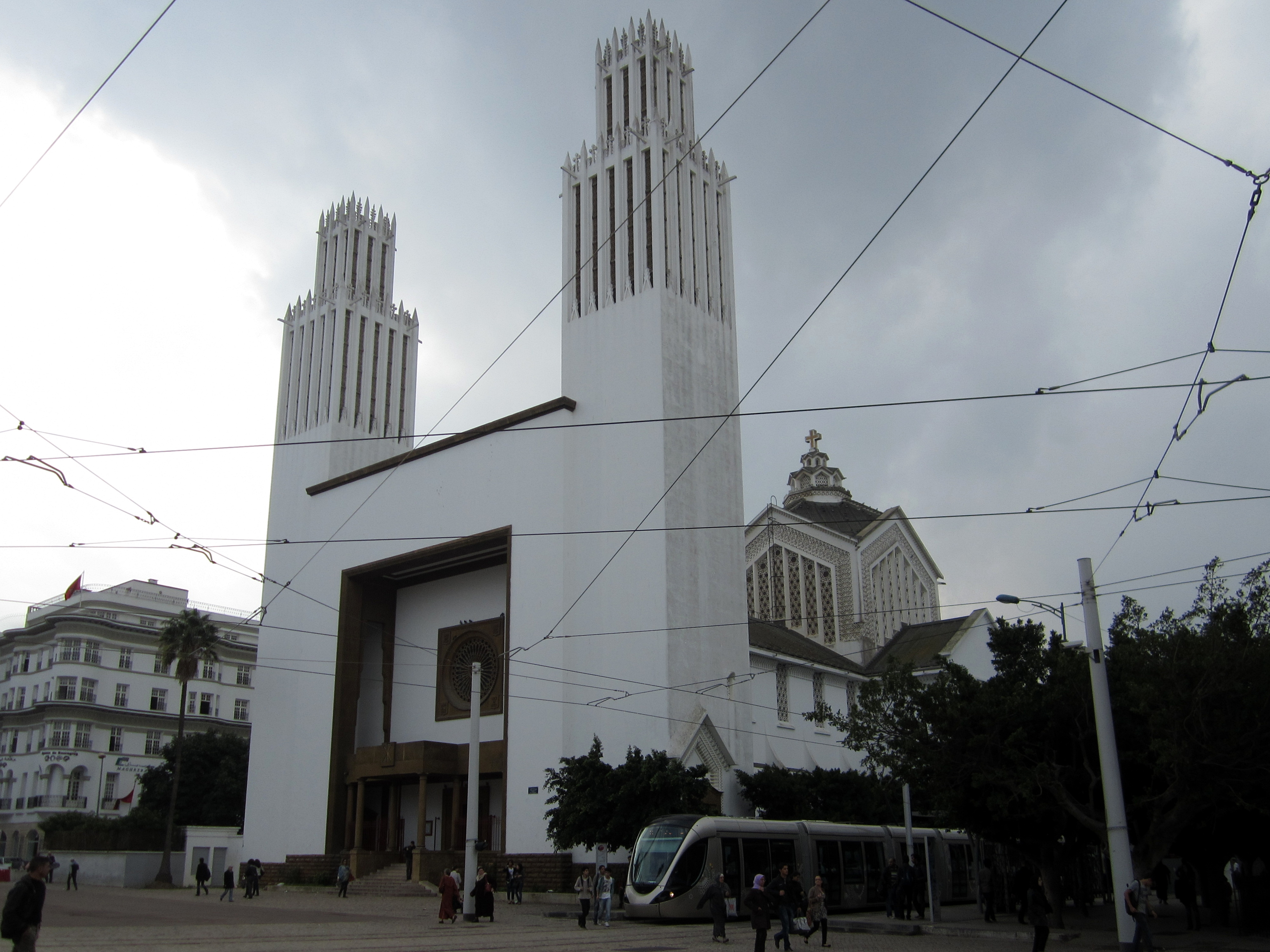
St. Peter's Cathedral, Rabat

In January 26, 1988, upon invitation of bishop Hubert Michon, two Trappist monks established a community of monks in Fez which later would move to Midelt and became the Priory of Our Lady of the Atlas. In 2015, the diocese became owner of the monastery of Tazert after the previous congregation of Poor Clares left. A new community of Sisters of St. Francis of Assisi took over the monastery in 2019 under the auspices of archbishop Cristóbal López Romero.

== Bishops ==
=== Ordinaries ===
==== Vicars Apostolic of Rabat ====
1. Victor Colomban Dreyer, O.F.M Cap. (1923–1927), appointed Vicar Apostolic of Canale di Suez {Suez Canal}, Egypt
2. Henri Vielle, O.F.M. (1927–1946)
3. Louis Lefèbvre, O.F.M. (1947–1955)

==== Archbishops of Rabat ====
1. Louis Lefèbvre, O.F.M. (1955–1968)
2. Jean Chabbert, O.F.M. (1968–1982), appointed Archbishop (personal title) of Perpignan-Elne, France
3. Hubert Michon (1983–2001)
4. Vincent Landel, S.C.J. (2001–2017)
5. Cristóbal López Romero, S.D.B. (2017–present)

=== Coadjutor Archbishops ===
- Jean-Berchmans-Marcel-Yves-Marie-Bernard Chabbert, O.F.M. (1967-1968)
- Vincent Louis Marie Landel, S.C.I. di Béth. (1999-2001)

=== Auxiliary Bishop ===
- Pierre-Jean-Marie-Louis Peurois, O.F.M. (1936-1946), resigned; (1957?-1959)

== See also ==
- Roman Catholicism in Morocco
- Roman Catholic Archdiocese of Tanger
