= Henchir Chigarnia =

Archaeological Site

Henchir Chigarnia is an Archaeological site in Tunisia. It is identified with ruins near the modern town of Enfidha, Tunisia and represents a former Roman town of the province of Africa Proconularis.

Henchir Chigarnia is an Archaeological site and former civitas of the Roman Province of Africa proconularis.

The ruins include a large fortress and of a church in which were found mosaics with epitaphs of various bishops and martyrs. There is also an Amphitheatre.

The bishopric of Uppenna has been brought into use as a Roman Catholic titular see since 1967.
