= Jean Chabbert =

French Catholic archbishop (1920–2016)

His Excellency Jean-Berchmans-Marcel-Yves-Marie-Bernard Chabbert O.F.M.
- Archbishop-Bishop Emeritus of Perpignan-Elne
- Church: Roman Catholic Church
- See: Diocese of Perpignan-Elne
- In office: 1982–1996
- Predecessor: Henry-Camille-Gustave-Marie L’Heureux
- Successor: André Louis Fort

Orders
- Ordination: 29 June 1947
- Consecration: 7 July 1967 by Cardinal Louis-Jean Guyot

Personal details
- Born: 31 December 1920 Castres, France
- Died: 20 September 2016 (aged 95) Castres, France

Jean-Berchmans-Marcel-Yves-Marie-Bernard Chabbert, OFM (31 December 1920 – 20 September 2016) was a French prelate of the Roman Catholic Church.

Chabbert was born in Castres and ordained a priest on 29 June 1947 in the Roman Catholic religious order of the Order of Friars Minor. Chabbert was appointed Coadjutor Archbishop of the Archdiocese of Rabat, in Morocco, as well as titular bishop of Quaestoriana on 13 April 1967 and was consecrated bishop on 7 July 1967; he succeeded to that see in 1968. Chabbert was then appointed bishop of the Diocese of Perpignan-Elne on 17 July 1982, and served there until his retirement on 16 January 1996. Chabbert died on 20 September 2016 at the age of 95.
