= Sergio Obeso Rivera =

Mexican cardinal (1931–2019)

His Eminence Sergio Obeso Rivera
- Archbishop of Xalapa
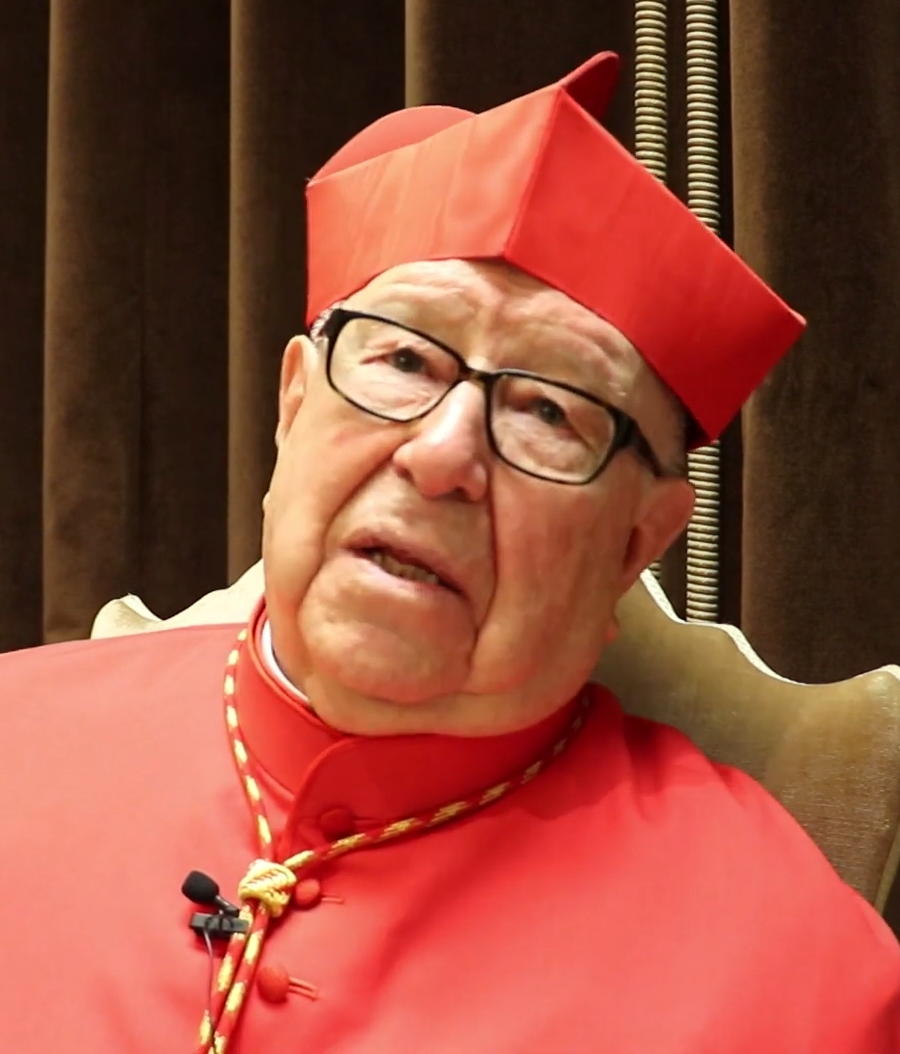
- Church: Roman Catholic Church
- Archdiocese: Xalapa
- See: Xalapa
- Appointed: 12 March 1979
- Term ended: 10 April 2007
- Predecessor: Emilio Abascal y Salmerón
- Successor: Hipólito Reyes Larios
- Other post: Cardinal Priest of San Leone I (2018–2019)
- Previous posts: Bishop of Papantla (1971–74); Titular Archbishop of Uppenna (1974–79); Coadjutor Archbishop of Xalapa (1974–79); President of the Mexican Episcopal Conference (1982–88; 1994–97)

Orders
- Ordination: 31 October 1954 by Clemente Micara
- Consecration: 21 June 1971 by Emilio Abascal y Salmerón
- Created cardinal: 28 June 2018 by Pope Francis
- Rank: Cardinal-Priest

Personal details
- Born: Sergio Obeso Rivera; 31 October 1931 Xalapa, Veracruz, Mexico
- Died: 11 August 2019 (aged 87) Coatepec, Veracruz, Mexico
- Buried: Xalapa Cathedral
- Education: Pontifical Gregorian University; Pontifical Latin American College
- Motto: Virtus in infirmitate (Power in weakness) 2 Cor 12:9
- Coat of arms

Sergio Obeso Rivera (Spanish pronunciation: [ˈseɾxjo oˈβeso riˈβeɾa]; 31 October 1931 – 11 August 2019) was a Mexican prelate of the Catholic Church. He was Archbishop of Xalapa from 1979 to 2007 after serving as Bishop of Papantla from 1971 to 1974 and then as coadjutor in Xalapa from 1974 to 1979. Pope Francis created him a cardinal on 28 June 2018.

== Biography ==
Sergio Obeso Rivera was born in Xalapa, Mexico on 31 October 1931. His father was a native of Asturias, Spain, and his mother was from Las Vigas de Ramírez, where he was raised. He entered the seminary in Xalapa on 23 January 1944 and was ordained in Rome on 31 October 1954 and while earning his doctorate in theology at the Pontifical Gregorian University. Until 1971 he held various positions at the Xalapa seminary, including prefect of philosophy, spiritual director, and rector.

On 30 April 1971, Pope Paul VI appointed him Bishop of Papantla and he was consecrated a bishop on 29 July.

On 18 January 1974, Pope Paul appointed him titular archbishop of Uppenna and Archbishop Coadjutor of Xalapa, and on 12 March 1979 he became Archbishop of Xalapa.

He was elected to the three three-year terms as president of the Episcopal Conference of Mexico in 1982, 1985, and 1994. He was also president of the Conference's Commission for Social Pastoral Care in 2002 when it called for reform of Mexico's Law of Indian Rights and Culture in a statement that said: "It is not possible to continue to live in a Mexico divided by racism and discrimination. The Indian peoples justly deserve the recognition of their cultures, of their way of seeing things, and of their autonomy."

Pope Benedict XVI accepted his resignation on 10 April 2007.

Pope Francis made Obeso a cardinal on 28 June 2018, assigning him the titular church of San Leone I. He took possession of his titular church at a Mass on 1 July.

In August 2018, Obeso said that while some accusations made by victims of Catholic Church sexual abuse cases are valid, about those who make accusations of pedophilia against Catholic clerics some should be "ashamed" to point their finger and "should have a little pity because they have tails that are stepped on, very long."

He died on 11 August 2019 at his home in Coatepec.

== See also ==
- Cardinals created by Francis
- Catholic Church in Mexico

Catholic Church titles
| Preceded by Alfonso Sánchez Tinoco | Bishop of Papantla; 30 April 1971 – 15 January 1974 | Succeeded by Genaro Alamilla Arteaga |
| Preceded by Emilio Abascal y Salmerón | Archbishop of Xalapa; 12 March 1979 – 10 April 2007 | Succeeded by Hipólito Reyes Larios |
| Preceded by Karl Lehmann | Cardinal-Priest of San Leone I 28 June 2018 – 11 August 2019 | Succeeded by Cristóbal López Romero |
