= St. Peter's Cathedral, Rabat =

Moroccan cultural heritage site

Coordinates: 34°01′04″N 6°49′53″W

St. Peter's Cathedral, Rabat Cathédrale Saint-Pierre de Rabat
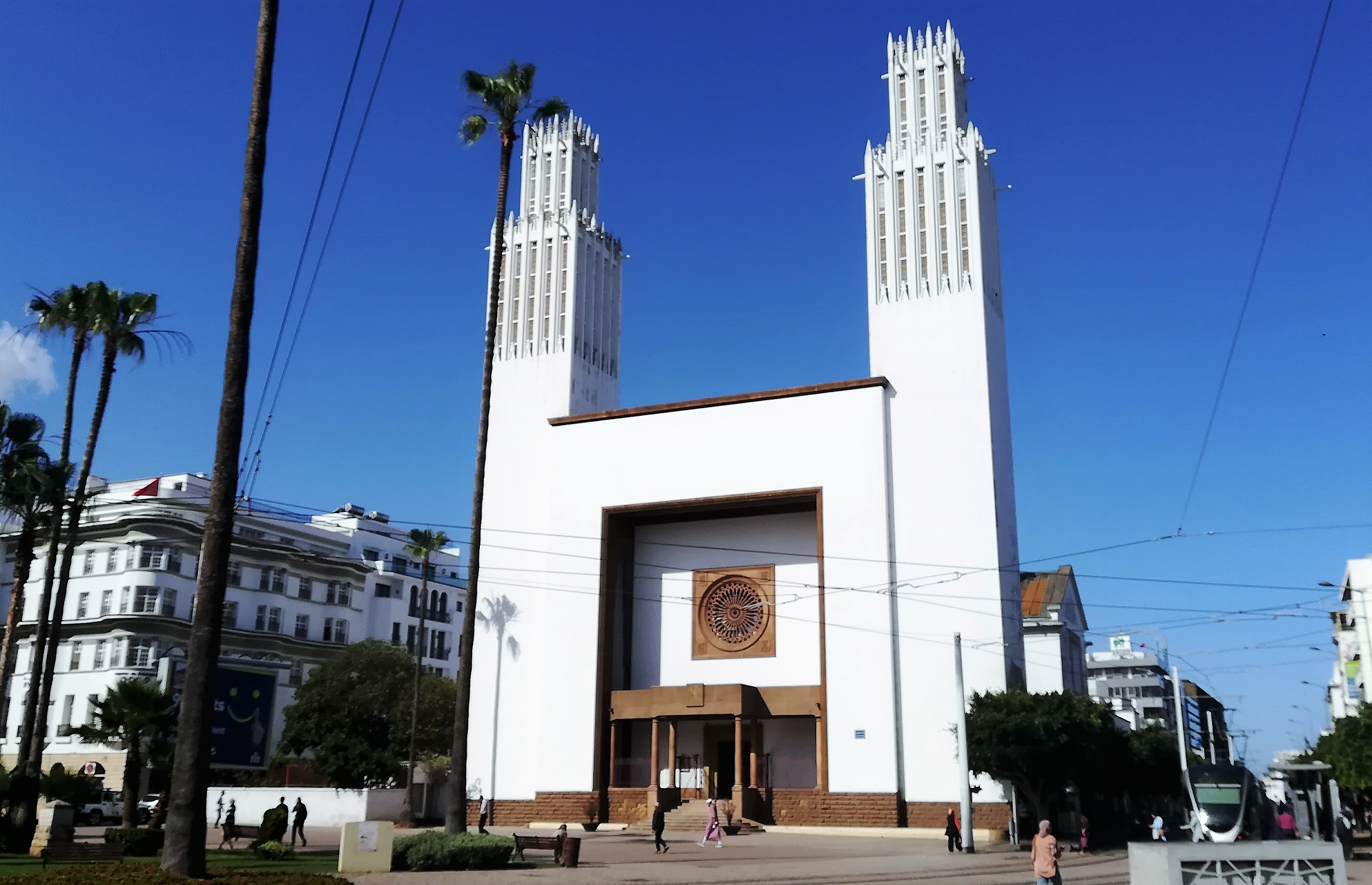
- St. Peter's Cathedral, Rabat

Religion
- Affiliation: Roman Catholic Church
- Province: Archdiocese of Rabat
- Rite: Latin Rite
- Ecclesiastical or organisational status: Cathedral
- Status: Active

Location
- Location: Rabat, Morocco
- Interactive map of St. Peter's Cathedral, Rabat; Cathédrale Saint-Pierre de Rabat

Architecture
- Type: Church
- Style: Art Deco
- Groundbreaking: 1919
- Completed: 1930s

St. Peter's Cathedral (French: Cathédrale Saint-Pierre de Rabat) is a Roman Catholic church located at Golan Square (Place du Golan) in downtown Rabat, Morocco. It was erected in the early 20th century in the Art Deco style. The cathedral is dedicated to Saint Peter, and is the ecclesiastical seat of the Archdiocese of Rabat.

Construction of the cathedral began in 1919, and its chief architect was Adrien Laforgue. The cathedral was inaugurated by Resident-General Hubert Lyautey in 1921. The two towers of the cathedral were added in the 1930s.

The cathedral is operational and Mass is celebrated daily.

== Images ==
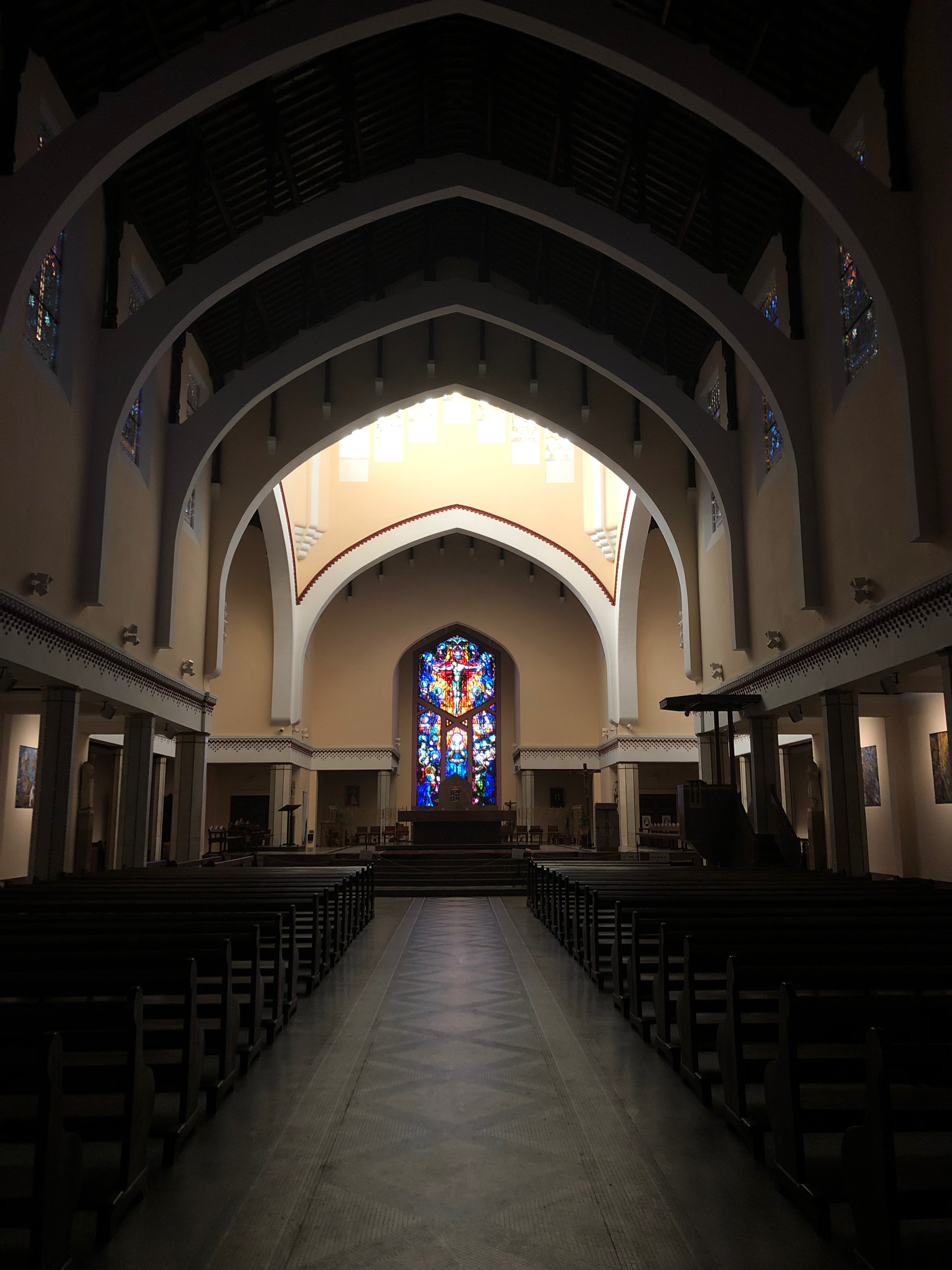
Interior.

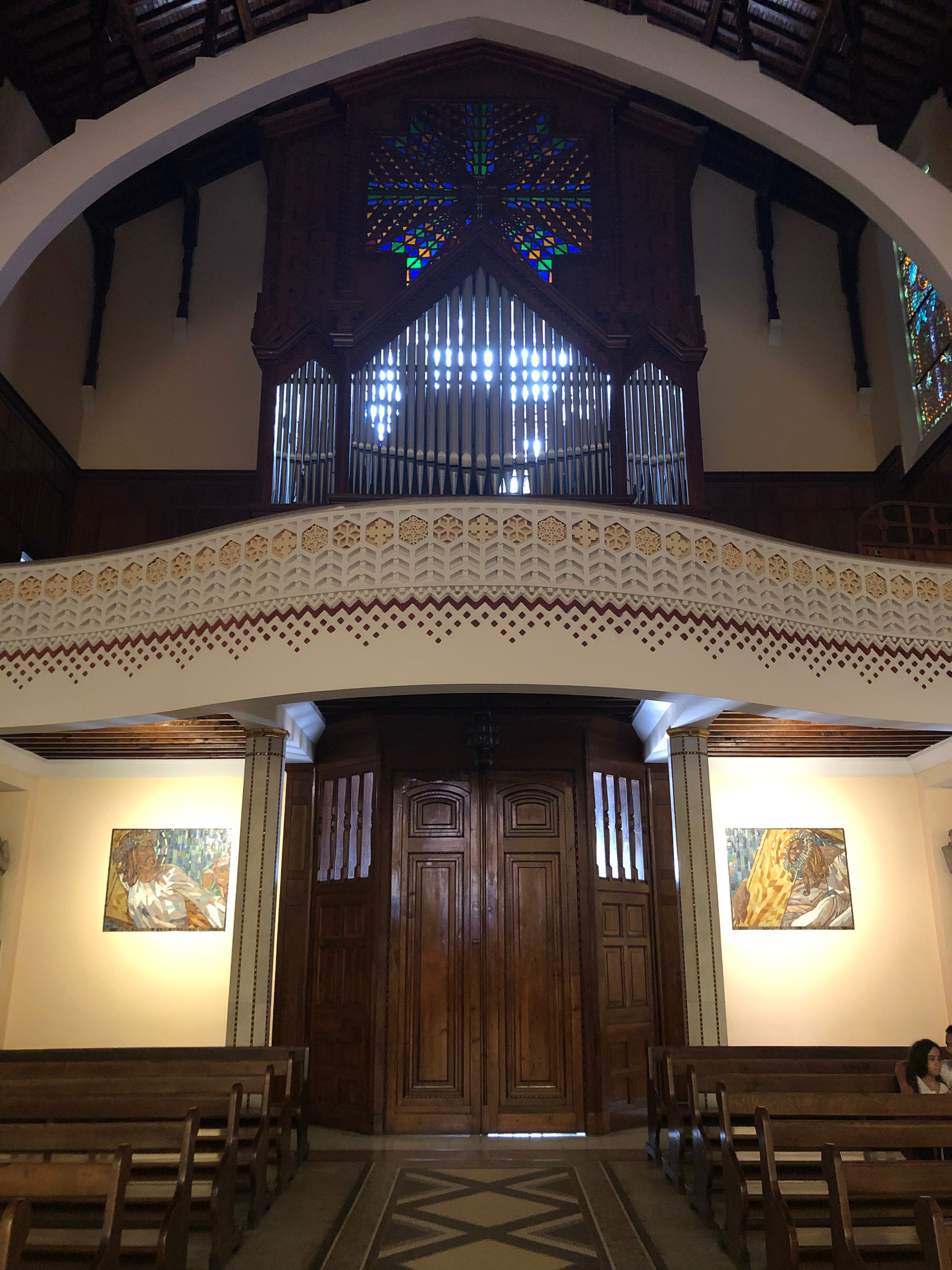
Choir.

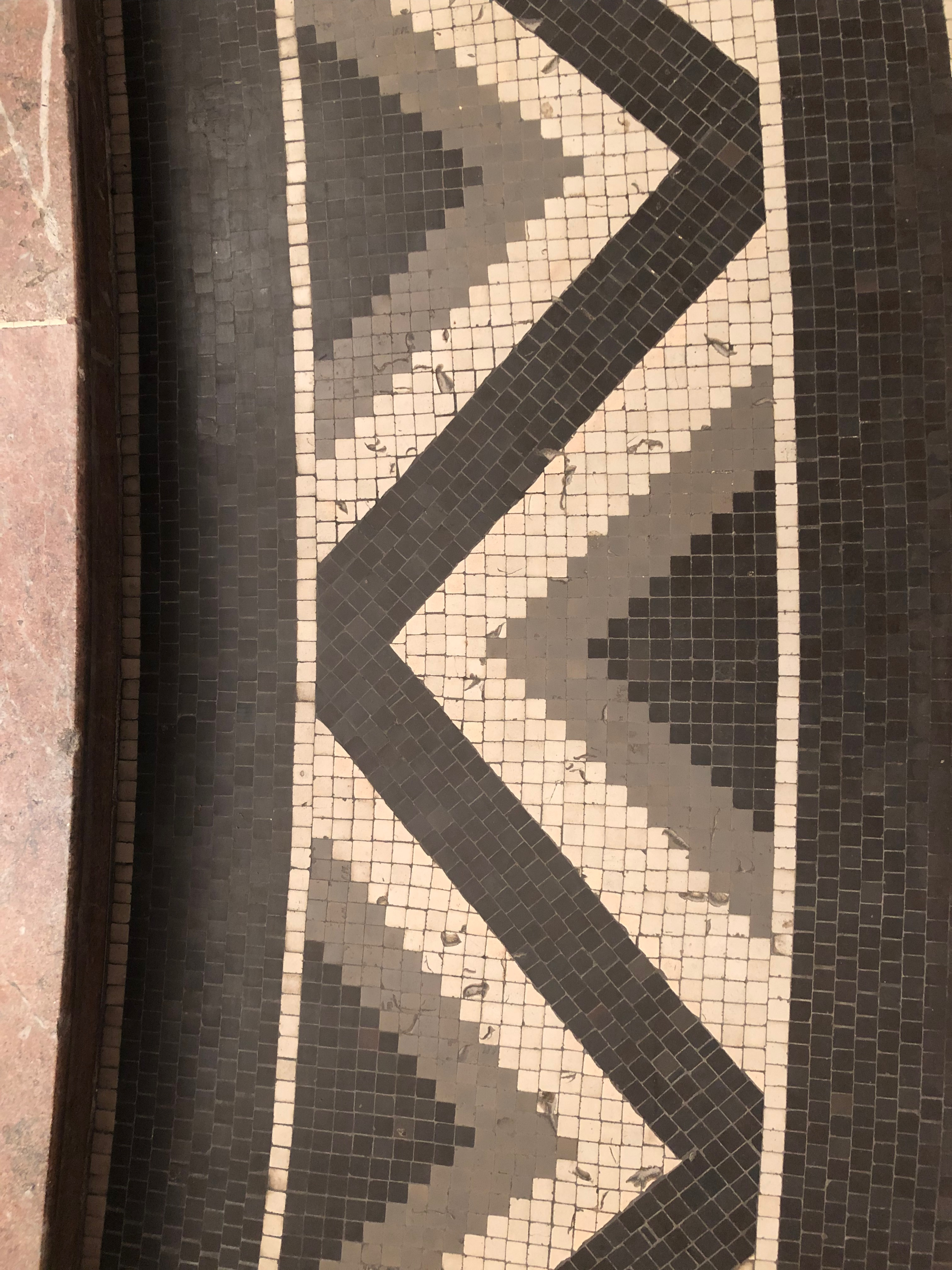
Close-up of the Art Deco floor.

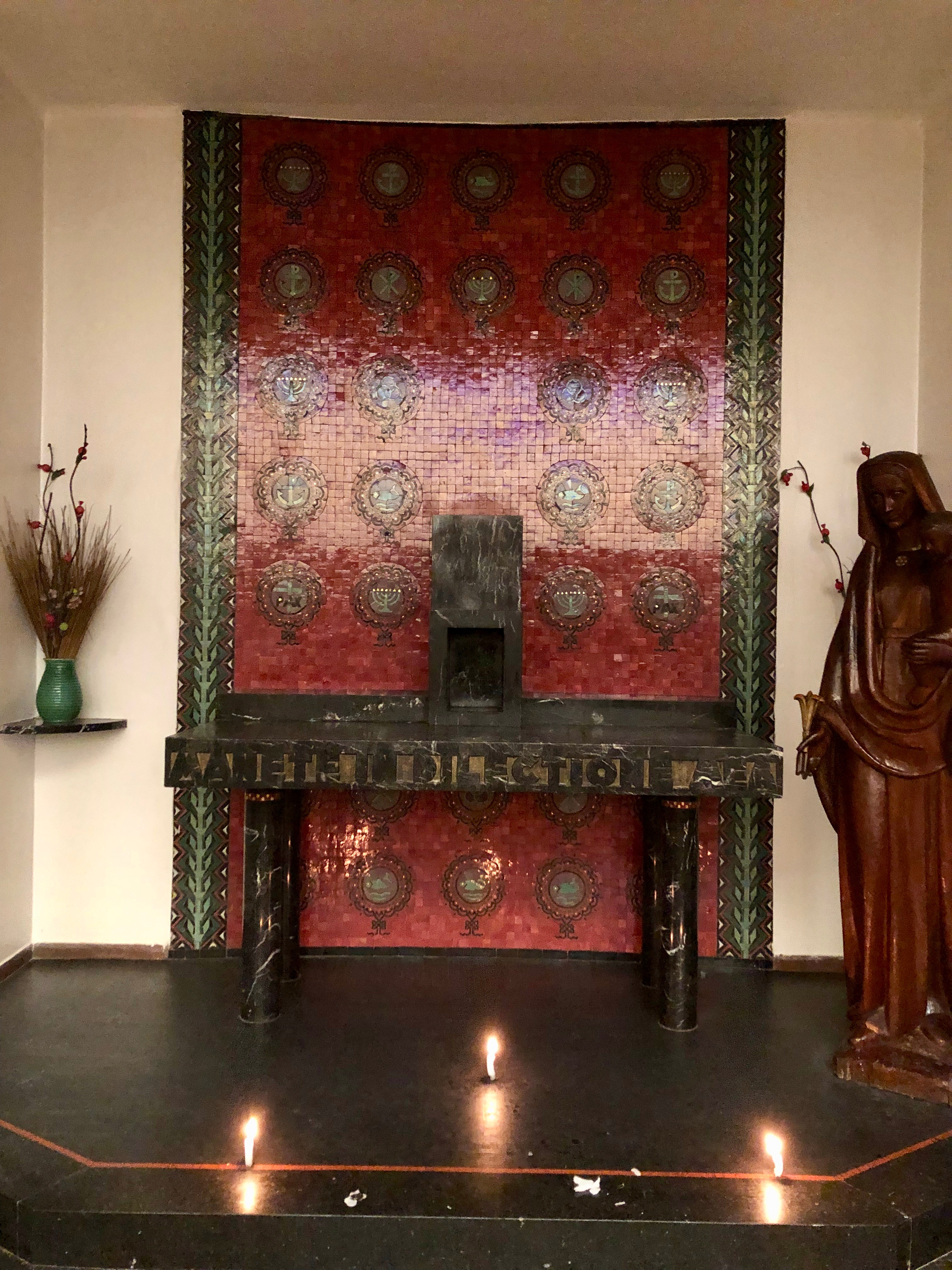
Side Altar.

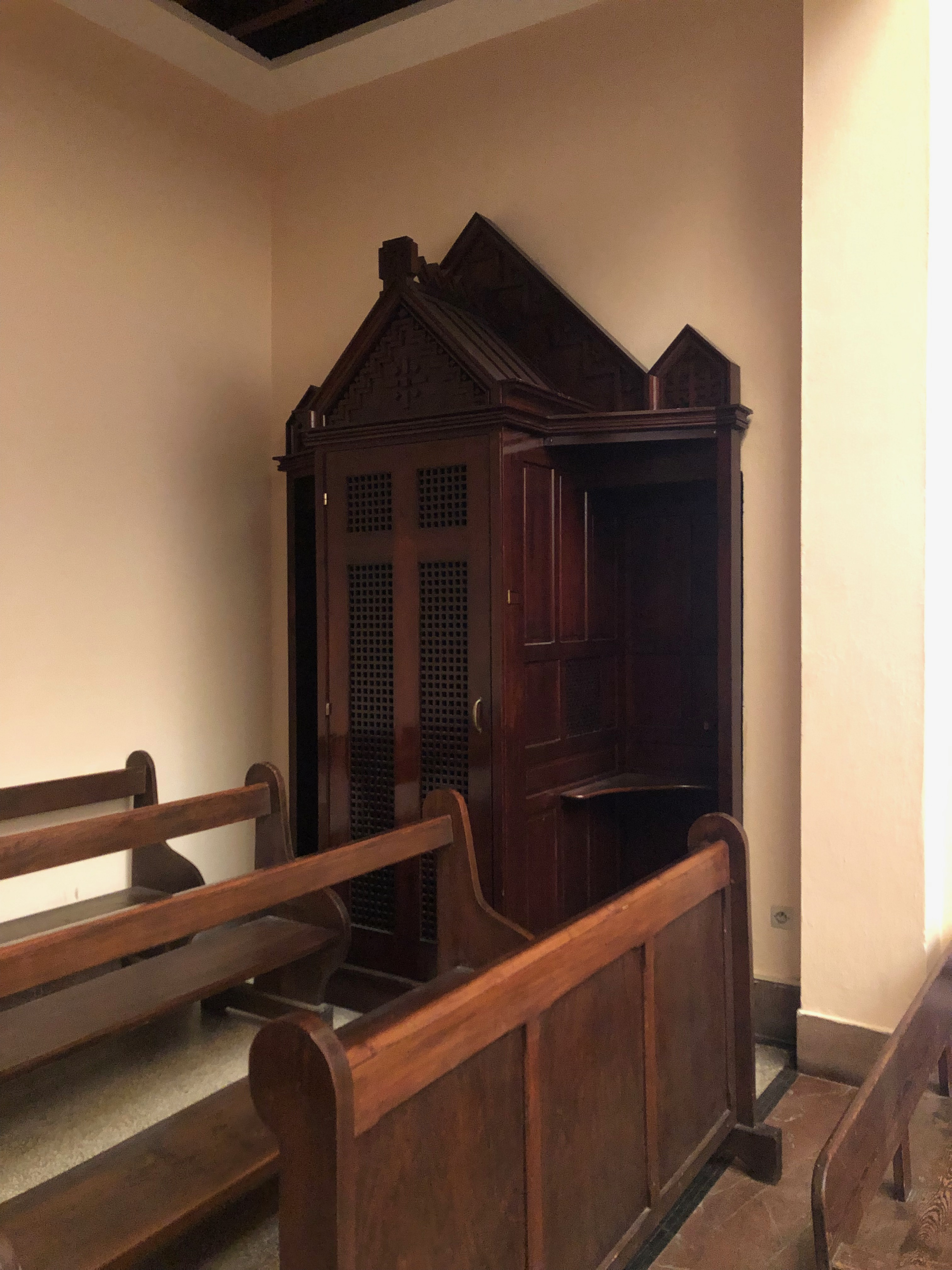
Confessional.

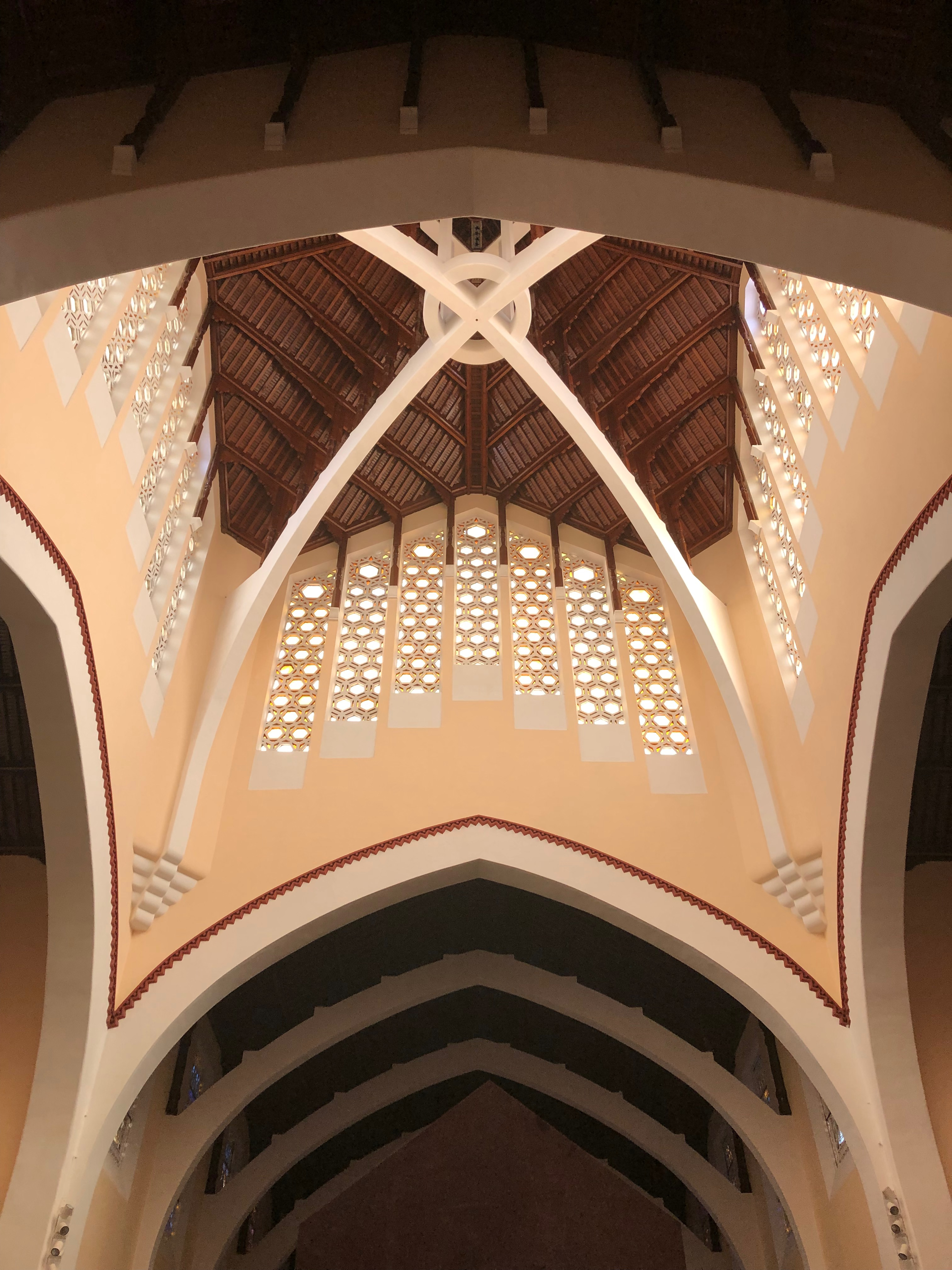
Ceiling.

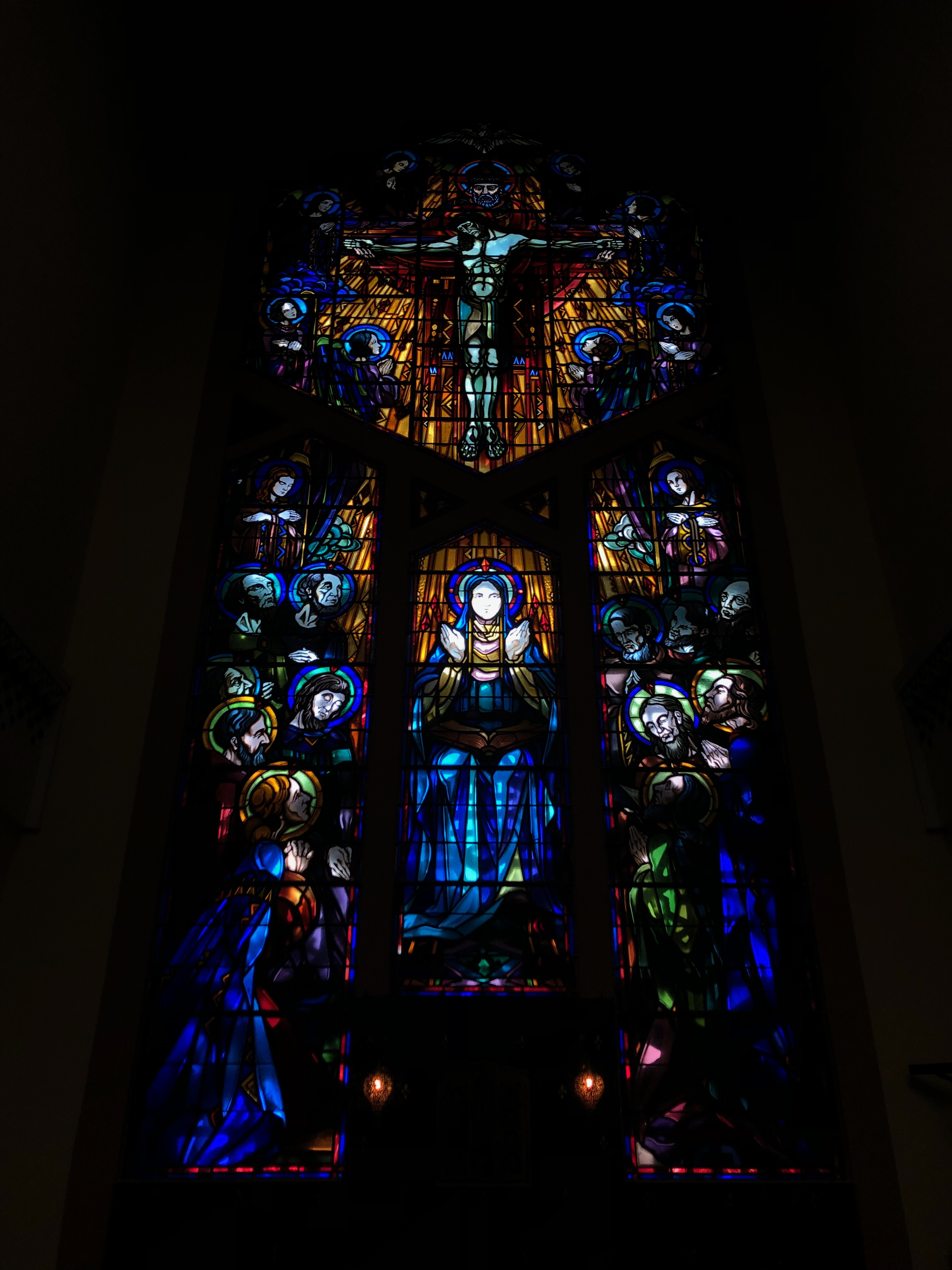
Stained glass window.

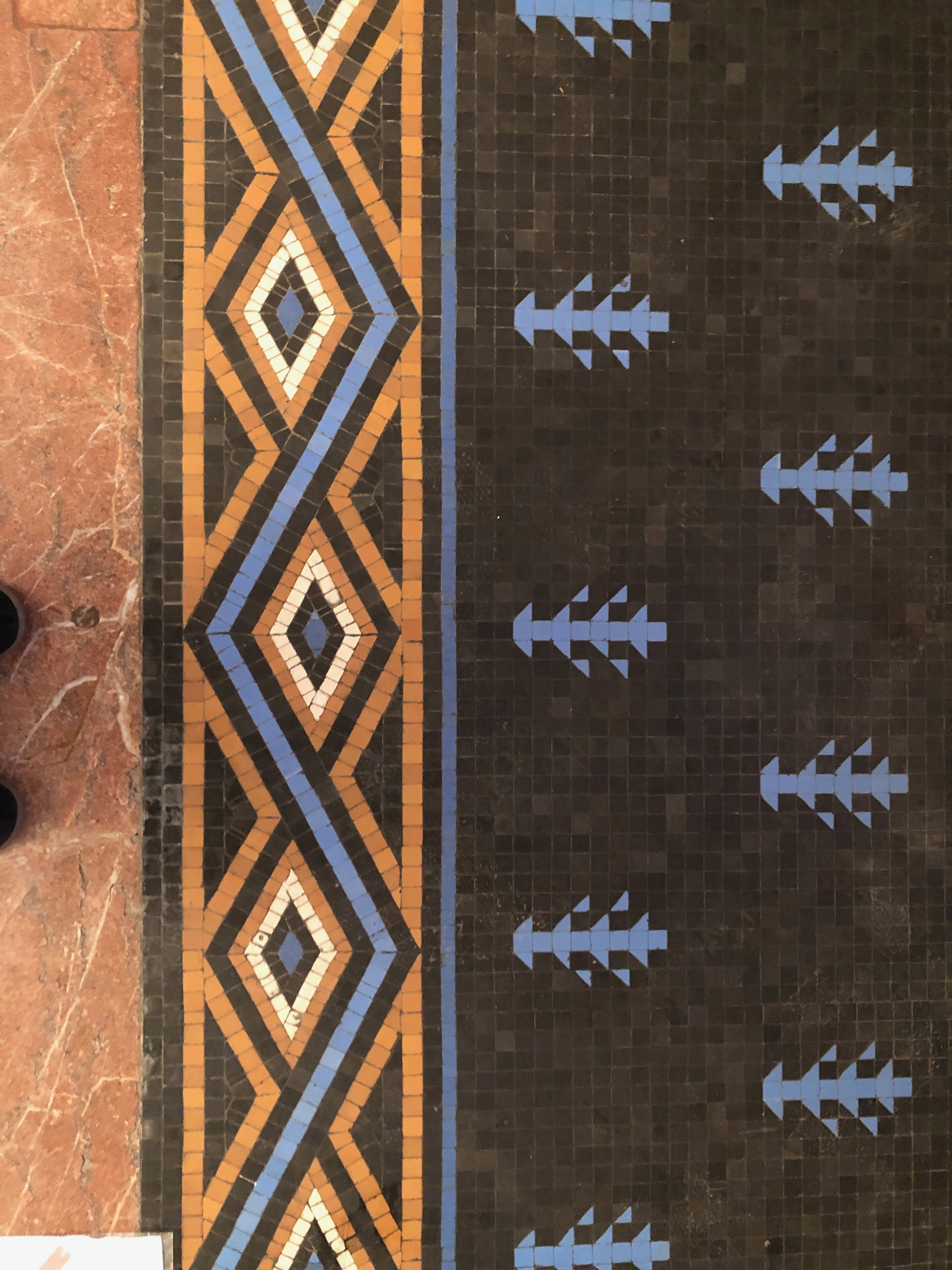
Floor.

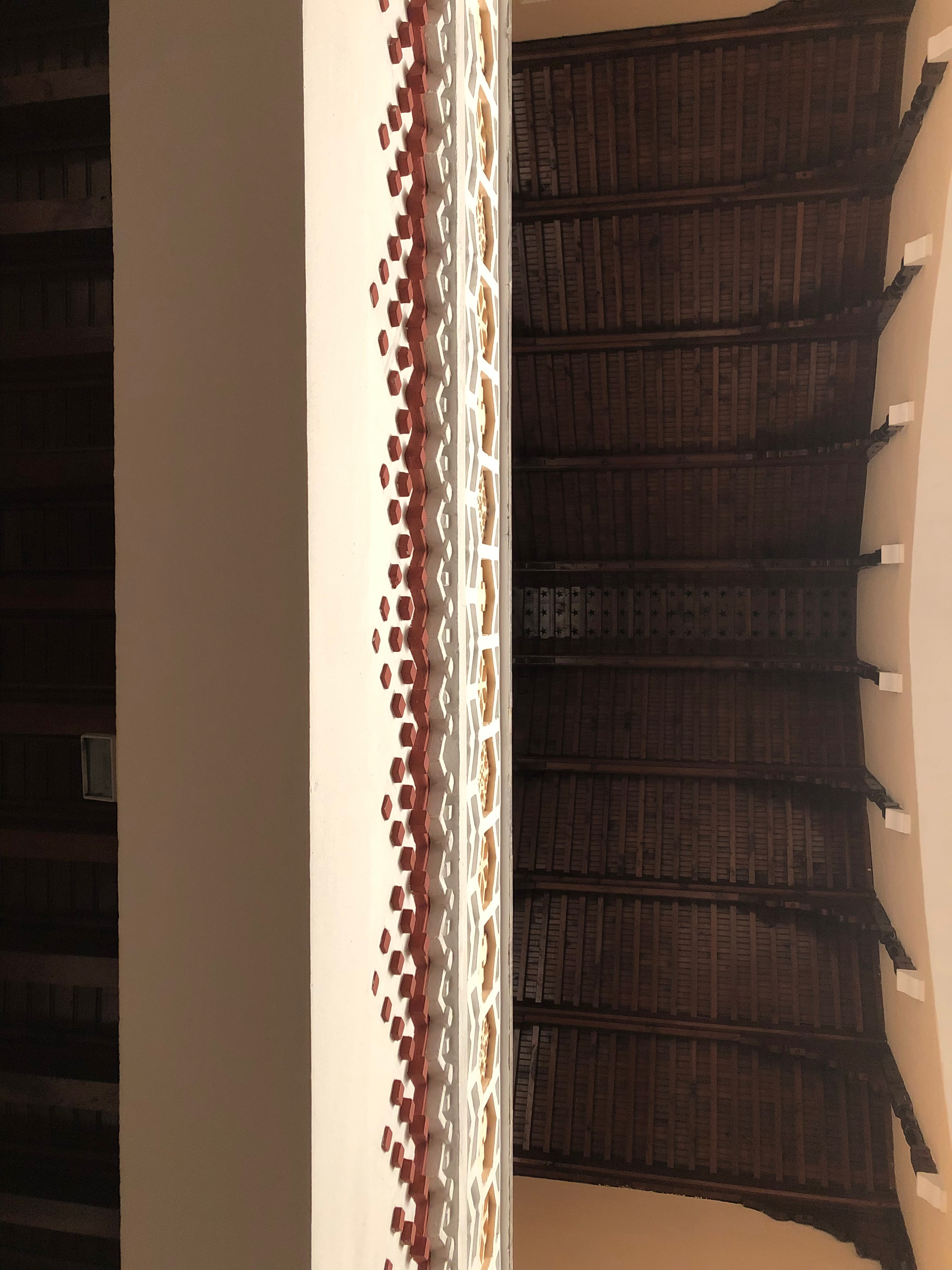
Geometric decoration in the Art Deco style.

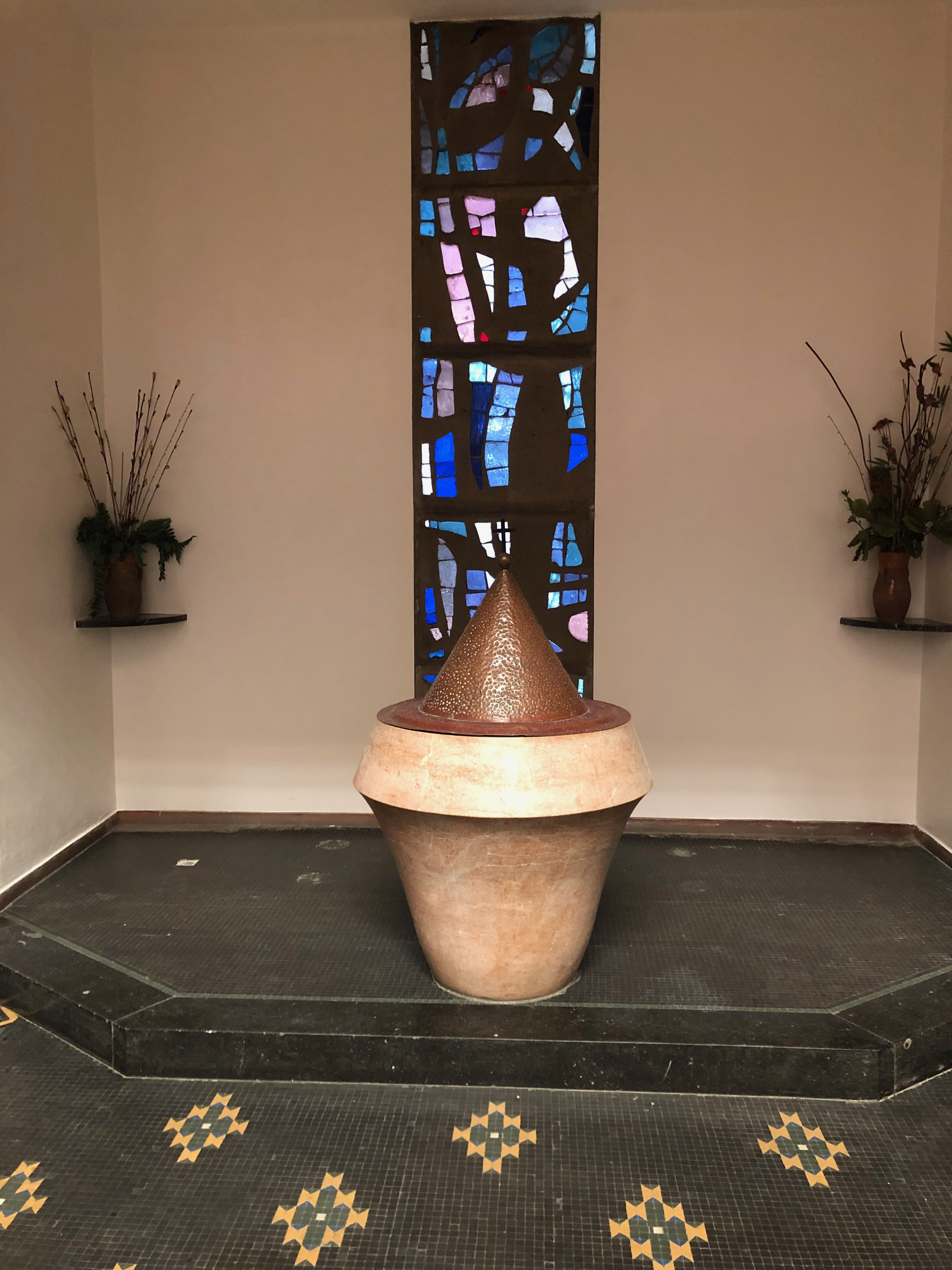
Baptistry.

== See also ==
- Casablanca Cathedral
- French Church of Tangier
- Roman Catholic Cathedral of Tangier
- St. Francis of Assisi Cathedral, Laayoune
- Our Lady of Mount Carmel Church, Dakhla
