= San Leone I =

- St. Leo I (in English); S. Leonis I Papæ (in Latin)
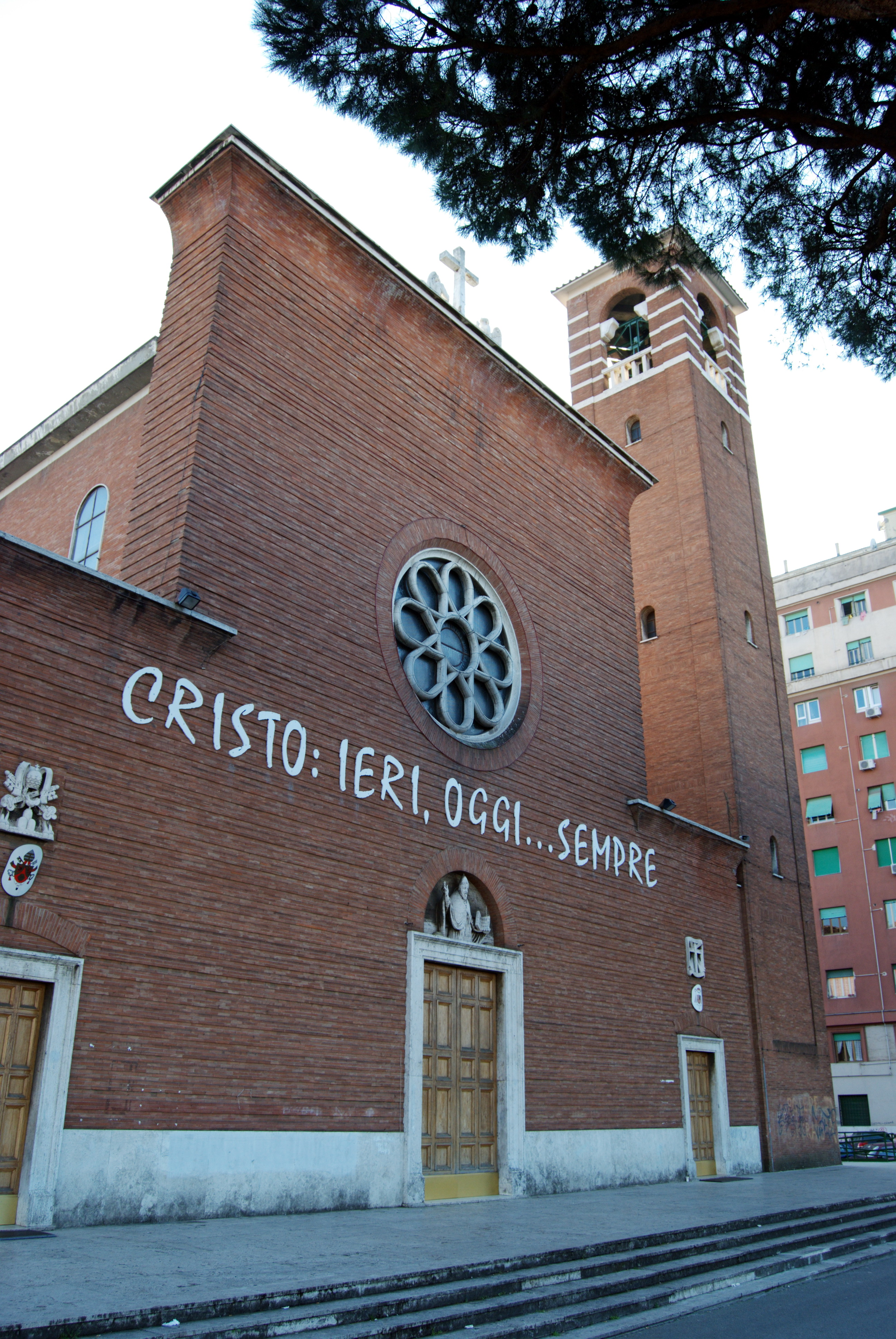
- Facade
- Click on the map for a fullscreen view
- 41°53′27″N 12°31′45″E
- Location: Via Prenestina 104, Rome
- Country: Italy
- Denomination: Roman Catholic
- Tradition: Roman Rite

History
- Status: Titular church
- Dedication: Pope Leo I
- Consecrated: 1952

Architecture
- Architect: Giuseppe Zander
- Architectural type: Church
- Groundbreaking: 1950
- Completed: 1952

The Church of San Leone is a Catholic church in the Prenestino-Labicano district of Rome, on the Via Praenestina. It is dedicated to the fifth-century pope, Pope Leo I.

== History ==
The church was built by the architect Giuseppe Zander between 1950 and 1952.

It is the home of the parish, established 7 October 1952 by decree of the Cardinal Vicar Clemente Micara Tricesimo iam vertente. In addition it is also home since 1965 the title of cardinal "San Leone I".

The church was visited by Pope John Paul II 17 December 1989.

== List of Cardinal Protectors ==
- Lorenz Jager (25 February 1965 – 7 April 1975)
- Roger Etchegaray (30 June 1979 – 24 June 1998)
- Karl Lehmann (21 February 2001 – 11 March 2018)
- Sergio Obeso Rivera (28 June 2018 – 11 August 2019)
- Cristóbal López Romero (5 October 2019 – present)
