= Enfidha =

Enfidha دار البي Dar-el-Bey
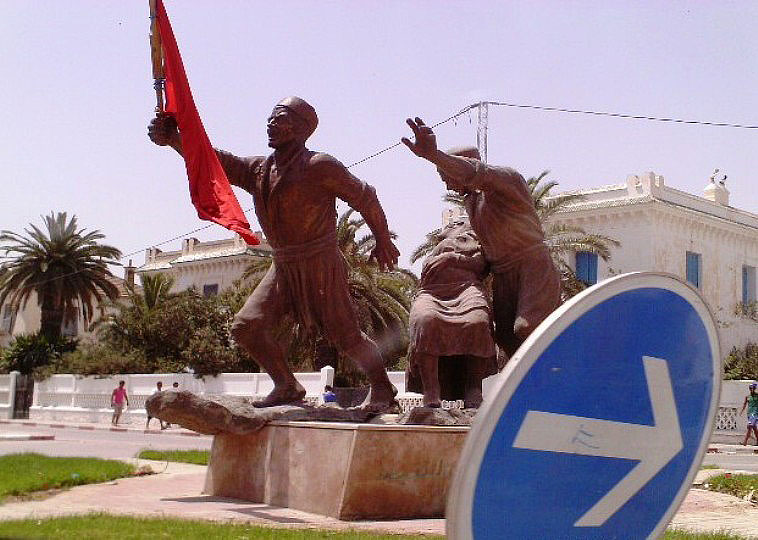
- Enfidha - square
- Nickname: Henchir Chigarnia
- Location in Tunisia
- Coordinates: 36°8′7″N 10°22′51″E
- Country: Tunisia
- Governorate: Sousse Governorate
- Delegation(s): Enfidha

Government
  - Mayor: Abdellatif Hamouda (Independent)

Population
  - City: 11,138
  - Metro: 49,335
- Time zone: UTC1 (CET)

Enfidha (or Dar-el-Bey, Arabic: دار البي Enfīđa / Dar el bāy) is a place in north-eastern Tunisia with a population of approximately 10,000. It is visited by tourists on their way to Takrouna. It lies on the railway between Tunis and Sousse, approximately 45 km northeast of Sousse and a few kilometres inland from the Gulf of Hammamet. The nearby Enfidha – Hammamet International Airport opened in 2009, serving charter flights from several European countries.

== History ==
=== Ancient history ===
Nearby Henchir Chigarnia is an Archaeological site and former civitas of the Roman Province of Africa Proconularis.

About 8 km north of Enfidaville is another Roman site Henchir Fraga, which is the ancient town of Uppenna, where ruins include a large fortress and of a church in which were found mosaics with epitaphs of various bishops and martyrs. The bishopric of Uppenna has been brought into use as a Roman Catholic titular see since 1967.

=== Early Modern History ===
The Enfida estate was granted by the bey Mahommed-es-Sadok to his chief minister, Khaireddin Pasha, in return for the confirmation by the sultan of Turkey in 1871, through the instrumentality of the pasha, of the right of succession to the beylik of members of Es-Sadok's family.

=== French Colonial Era ===
When Khaireddin left Tunisia for Constantinople some years later, he sold the estate to a Marseille company which named it Enfidaville. The attempt by the Tunisian authorities to block the sale of the estate to a French buyer is regarded as a contributory factor in the decision of the French government to bring Tunisia under colonial rule. The estate was later sold on to the Société Franco-Africaine. Enfidaville became the chief settlement on the Enfida estate, a property of over 300,000 acres (1,200 km^{2}) in the Sahel district of Tunisia, forming a rectangle between the towns of Hammamet, Sousse, Kairouan and Zaghouan. On this estate, devoted to the cultivation of cereals, olives, vines and to pasturage, were colonies of Europeans and natives. At Enfidaville, which was, as its native name indicates, a palace of the beys of Tunis, came a large horse-breeding establishment and a much-frequented weekly market.

=== World War II ===
Enfidaville was the site of the last battle in the North African Campaign of World War II, and was the site of an Allied Airfield.

In April 1943 during Operation Strike, the American Corps II cornered the Axis powers force against the Tunisian Coast. The British Eighth Army attacked Enfidaville on 19 April captured the village, but met strong resistance. Attacks further north saw the fall of Tunis on 7 May, to the British First Army and Bizerta on 8 May to the Americans. Resuming the assault on Enfidaville on 11–13 May, the city saw the defeat of Axis forces but with significant casualties. 1,551 Allied casualties were buried in the Enfidaville War Cemetery, including Wing Commander Ian Gleed DSO DFC, an English RAF pilot and flying ace, who was shot down over Cap Bon.

== Notable people ==
- Sufyan Rajab (born 1979) - poet and writer
